

92001–92100 

|-bgcolor=#d6d6d6
| 92001 ||  || — || November 13, 1999 || Catalina || CSS || — || align=right | 6.7 km || 
|-id=002 bgcolor=#d6d6d6
| 92002 ||  || — || November 14, 1999 || Socorro || LINEAR || — || align=right | 5.7 km || 
|-id=003 bgcolor=#d6d6d6
| 92003 ||  || — || November 14, 1999 || Socorro || LINEAR || — || align=right | 6.5 km || 
|-id=004 bgcolor=#d6d6d6
| 92004 ||  || — || November 14, 1999 || Socorro || LINEAR || — || align=right | 5.7 km || 
|-id=005 bgcolor=#d6d6d6
| 92005 ||  || — || November 14, 1999 || Kitt Peak || Spacewatch || — || align=right | 8.3 km || 
|-id=006 bgcolor=#d6d6d6
| 92006 ||  || — || November 9, 1999 || Socorro || LINEAR || — || align=right | 5.5 km || 
|-id=007 bgcolor=#d6d6d6
| 92007 ||  || — || November 9, 1999 || Socorro || LINEAR || 7:4* || align=right | 4.8 km || 
|-id=008 bgcolor=#d6d6d6
| 92008 ||  || — || November 12, 1999 || Socorro || LINEAR || — || align=right | 4.5 km || 
|-id=009 bgcolor=#E9E9E9
| 92009 ||  || — || November 14, 1999 || Socorro || LINEAR || — || align=right | 2.8 km || 
|-id=010 bgcolor=#d6d6d6
| 92010 ||  || — || November 14, 1999 || Socorro || LINEAR || — || align=right | 6.4 km || 
|-id=011 bgcolor=#d6d6d6
| 92011 ||  || — || November 14, 1999 || Socorro || LINEAR || — || align=right | 15 km || 
|-id=012 bgcolor=#d6d6d6
| 92012 ||  || — || November 14, 1999 || Socorro || LINEAR || — || align=right | 6.9 km || 
|-id=013 bgcolor=#d6d6d6
| 92013 ||  || — || November 14, 1999 || Socorro || LINEAR || URS || align=right | 6.9 km || 
|-id=014 bgcolor=#d6d6d6
| 92014 ||  || — || November 14, 1999 || Socorro || LINEAR || — || align=right | 6.2 km || 
|-id=015 bgcolor=#d6d6d6
| 92015 ||  || — || November 14, 1999 || Socorro || LINEAR || — || align=right | 7.7 km || 
|-id=016 bgcolor=#d6d6d6
| 92016 ||  || — || November 14, 1999 || Socorro || LINEAR || — || align=right | 7.2 km || 
|-id=017 bgcolor=#d6d6d6
| 92017 ||  || — || November 14, 1999 || Socorro || LINEAR || — || align=right | 6.0 km || 
|-id=018 bgcolor=#d6d6d6
| 92018 ||  || — || November 14, 1999 || Socorro || LINEAR || — || align=right | 7.6 km || 
|-id=019 bgcolor=#d6d6d6
| 92019 ||  || — || November 14, 1999 || Socorro || LINEAR || KOR || align=right | 3.6 km || 
|-id=020 bgcolor=#d6d6d6
| 92020 ||  || — || November 14, 1999 || Socorro || LINEAR || — || align=right | 6.2 km || 
|-id=021 bgcolor=#d6d6d6
| 92021 ||  || — || November 14, 1999 || Socorro || LINEAR || — || align=right | 5.9 km || 
|-id=022 bgcolor=#d6d6d6
| 92022 ||  || — || November 14, 1999 || Socorro || LINEAR || EOS || align=right | 3.5 km || 
|-id=023 bgcolor=#d6d6d6
| 92023 ||  || — || November 14, 1999 || Socorro || LINEAR || — || align=right | 5.8 km || 
|-id=024 bgcolor=#d6d6d6
| 92024 ||  || — || November 14, 1999 || Socorro || LINEAR || HYG || align=right | 6.1 km || 
|-id=025 bgcolor=#d6d6d6
| 92025 ||  || — || November 14, 1999 || Socorro || LINEAR || — || align=right | 9.6 km || 
|-id=026 bgcolor=#d6d6d6
| 92026 ||  || — || November 5, 1999 || Socorro || LINEAR || — || align=right | 9.0 km || 
|-id=027 bgcolor=#d6d6d6
| 92027 ||  || — || November 5, 1999 || Socorro || LINEAR || — || align=right | 6.9 km || 
|-id=028 bgcolor=#d6d6d6
| 92028 ||  || — || November 5, 1999 || Socorro || LINEAR || THB || align=right | 6.2 km || 
|-id=029 bgcolor=#d6d6d6
| 92029 ||  || — || November 6, 1999 || Socorro || LINEAR || HYG || align=right | 7.6 km || 
|-id=030 bgcolor=#d6d6d6
| 92030 ||  || — || November 6, 1999 || Socorro || LINEAR || — || align=right | 5.5 km || 
|-id=031 bgcolor=#d6d6d6
| 92031 ||  || — || November 6, 1999 || Socorro || LINEAR || — || align=right | 5.2 km || 
|-id=032 bgcolor=#d6d6d6
| 92032 ||  || — || November 6, 1999 || Socorro || LINEAR || — || align=right | 7.6 km || 
|-id=033 bgcolor=#d6d6d6
| 92033 ||  || — || November 6, 1999 || Socorro || LINEAR || — || align=right | 6.2 km || 
|-id=034 bgcolor=#d6d6d6
| 92034 ||  || — || November 6, 1999 || Socorro || LINEAR || URS || align=right | 3.5 km || 
|-id=035 bgcolor=#d6d6d6
| 92035 ||  || — || November 5, 1999 || Socorro || LINEAR || — || align=right | 3.3 km || 
|-id=036 bgcolor=#fefefe
| 92036 ||  || — || November 7, 1999 || Socorro || LINEAR || H || align=right | 1.3 km || 
|-id=037 bgcolor=#d6d6d6
| 92037 ||  || — || November 15, 1999 || Socorro || LINEAR || THM || align=right | 4.1 km || 
|-id=038 bgcolor=#d6d6d6
| 92038 ||  || — || November 15, 1999 || Socorro || LINEAR || — || align=right | 6.3 km || 
|-id=039 bgcolor=#d6d6d6
| 92039 ||  || — || November 15, 1999 || Socorro || LINEAR || URS || align=right | 6.5 km || 
|-id=040 bgcolor=#d6d6d6
| 92040 ||  || — || November 1, 1999 || Anderson Mesa || LONEOS || — || align=right | 8.0 km || 
|-id=041 bgcolor=#d6d6d6
| 92041 ||  || — || November 2, 1999 || Catalina || CSS || KOR || align=right | 3.7 km || 
|-id=042 bgcolor=#d6d6d6
| 92042 ||  || — || November 3, 1999 || Catalina || CSS || EOS || align=right | 4.3 km || 
|-id=043 bgcolor=#d6d6d6
| 92043 ||  || — || November 1, 1999 || Catalina || CSS || — || align=right | 7.7 km || 
|-id=044 bgcolor=#d6d6d6
| 92044 ||  || — || November 1, 1999 || Catalina || CSS || KOR || align=right | 3.0 km || 
|-id=045 bgcolor=#d6d6d6
| 92045 ||  || — || November 2, 1999 || Catalina || CSS || — || align=right | 6.7 km || 
|-id=046 bgcolor=#d6d6d6
| 92046 ||  || — || November 5, 1999 || Catalina || CSS || TIR || align=right | 4.4 km || 
|-id=047 bgcolor=#d6d6d6
| 92047 ||  || — || November 3, 1999 || Socorro || LINEAR || — || align=right | 5.0 km || 
|-id=048 bgcolor=#E9E9E9
| 92048 ||  || — || November 6, 1999 || Catalina || CSS || — || align=right | 4.0 km || 
|-id=049 bgcolor=#d6d6d6
| 92049 ||  || — || November 8, 1999 || Anderson Mesa || LONEOS || — || align=right | 9.0 km || 
|-id=050 bgcolor=#d6d6d6
| 92050 ||  || — || November 11, 1999 || Catalina || CSS || EOS || align=right | 4.4 km || 
|-id=051 bgcolor=#d6d6d6
| 92051 ||  || — || November 9, 1999 || Catalina || CSS || — || align=right | 6.9 km || 
|-id=052 bgcolor=#E9E9E9
| 92052 ||  || — || November 10, 1999 || Socorro || LINEAR || GEF || align=right | 3.6 km || 
|-id=053 bgcolor=#d6d6d6
| 92053 ||  || — || November 12, 1999 || Anderson Mesa || LONEOS || — || align=right | 5.5 km || 
|-id=054 bgcolor=#d6d6d6
| 92054 ||  || — || November 12, 1999 || Anderson Mesa || LONEOS || — || align=right | 7.5 km || 
|-id=055 bgcolor=#d6d6d6
| 92055 ||  || — || November 12, 1999 || Anderson Mesa || LONEOS || — || align=right | 7.3 km || 
|-id=056 bgcolor=#d6d6d6
| 92056 ||  || — || November 13, 1999 || Anderson Mesa || LONEOS || — || align=right | 13 km || 
|-id=057 bgcolor=#d6d6d6
| 92057 ||  || — || November 3, 1999 || Socorro || LINEAR || — || align=right | 6.2 km || 
|-id=058 bgcolor=#d6d6d6
| 92058 ||  || — || November 3, 1999 || Catalina || CSS || — || align=right | 5.9 km || 
|-id=059 bgcolor=#d6d6d6
| 92059 ||  || — || November 5, 1999 || Socorro || LINEAR || — || align=right | 3.9 km || 
|-id=060 bgcolor=#d6d6d6
| 92060 ||  || — || November 28, 1999 || Višnjan Observatory || K. Korlević || — || align=right | 10 km || 
|-id=061 bgcolor=#d6d6d6
| 92061 ||  || — || November 29, 1999 || Olathe || L. Robinson || — || align=right | 4.7 km || 
|-id=062 bgcolor=#d6d6d6
| 92062 ||  || — || November 28, 1999 || Kitt Peak || Spacewatch || — || align=right | 5.0 km || 
|-id=063 bgcolor=#d6d6d6
| 92063 ||  || — || November 29, 1999 || Kitt Peak || Spacewatch || — || align=right | 10 km || 
|-id=064 bgcolor=#d6d6d6
| 92064 ||  || — || November 26, 1999 || Ondřejov || L. Kotková || — || align=right | 4.1 km || 
|-id=065 bgcolor=#d6d6d6
| 92065 ||  || — || November 28, 1999 || Kitt Peak || Spacewatch || — || align=right | 7.2 km || 
|-id=066 bgcolor=#d6d6d6
| 92066 ||  || — || November 28, 1999 || Kitt Peak || Spacewatch || — || align=right | 9.6 km || 
|-id=067 bgcolor=#d6d6d6
| 92067 ||  || — || November 28, 1999 || Kitt Peak || Spacewatch || — || align=right | 6.4 km || 
|-id=068 bgcolor=#d6d6d6
| 92068 ||  || — || November 28, 1999 || Kitt Peak || Spacewatch || — || align=right | 6.6 km || 
|-id=069 bgcolor=#d6d6d6
| 92069 ||  || — || November 29, 1999 || Kitt Peak || Spacewatch || THM || align=right | 5.2 km || 
|-id=070 bgcolor=#d6d6d6
| 92070 ||  || — || November 30, 1999 || Kitt Peak || Spacewatch || — || align=right | 6.2 km || 
|-id=071 bgcolor=#d6d6d6
| 92071 ||  || — || November 29, 1999 || Višnjan Observatory || K. Korlević || — || align=right | 7.3 km || 
|-id=072 bgcolor=#d6d6d6
| 92072 ||  || — || November 16, 1999 || Modra || Modra Obs. || HYG || align=right | 8.2 km || 
|-id=073 bgcolor=#d6d6d6
| 92073 ||  || — || December 4, 1999 || Catalina || CSS || — || align=right | 4.5 km || 
|-id=074 bgcolor=#d6d6d6
| 92074 ||  || — || December 4, 1999 || Catalina || CSS || EOS || align=right | 5.8 km || 
|-id=075 bgcolor=#d6d6d6
| 92075 ||  || — || December 4, 1999 || Catalina || CSS || HYG || align=right | 5.7 km || 
|-id=076 bgcolor=#d6d6d6
| 92076 ||  || — || December 4, 1999 || Catalina || CSS || — || align=right | 6.5 km || 
|-id=077 bgcolor=#d6d6d6
| 92077 ||  || — || December 4, 1999 || Catalina || CSS || HYG || align=right | 5.8 km || 
|-id=078 bgcolor=#d6d6d6
| 92078 ||  || — || December 5, 1999 || Catalina || CSS || — || align=right | 6.7 km || 
|-id=079 bgcolor=#d6d6d6
| 92079 ||  || — || December 5, 1999 || Catalina || CSS || VER || align=right | 8.0 km || 
|-id=080 bgcolor=#d6d6d6
| 92080 ||  || — || December 5, 1999 || Socorro || LINEAR || — || align=right | 7.2 km || 
|-id=081 bgcolor=#d6d6d6
| 92081 ||  || — || December 3, 1999 || Socorro || LINEAR || BRA || align=right | 5.9 km || 
|-id=082 bgcolor=#d6d6d6
| 92082 ||  || — || December 3, 1999 || Socorro || LINEAR || EOS || align=right | 6.9 km || 
|-id=083 bgcolor=#d6d6d6
| 92083 ||  || — || December 5, 1999 || Socorro || LINEAR || — || align=right | 6.6 km || 
|-id=084 bgcolor=#d6d6d6
| 92084 ||  || — || December 5, 1999 || Socorro || LINEAR || — || align=right | 7.2 km || 
|-id=085 bgcolor=#d6d6d6
| 92085 ||  || — || December 5, 1999 || Socorro || LINEAR || — || align=right | 6.2 km || 
|-id=086 bgcolor=#E9E9E9
| 92086 ||  || — || December 6, 1999 || Socorro || LINEAR || GEF || align=right | 3.7 km || 
|-id=087 bgcolor=#d6d6d6
| 92087 ||  || — || December 6, 1999 || Socorro || LINEAR || EOS || align=right | 4.3 km || 
|-id=088 bgcolor=#d6d6d6
| 92088 ||  || — || December 6, 1999 || Socorro || LINEAR || EOS || align=right | 6.4 km || 
|-id=089 bgcolor=#d6d6d6
| 92089 ||  || — || December 6, 1999 || Socorro || LINEAR || ALA || align=right | 8.8 km || 
|-id=090 bgcolor=#d6d6d6
| 92090 ||  || — || December 6, 1999 || Socorro || LINEAR || THM || align=right | 6.9 km || 
|-id=091 bgcolor=#d6d6d6
| 92091 ||  || — || December 6, 1999 || Socorro || LINEAR || — || align=right | 8.1 km || 
|-id=092 bgcolor=#d6d6d6
| 92092 ||  || — || December 6, 1999 || Socorro || LINEAR || — || align=right | 6.1 km || 
|-id=093 bgcolor=#d6d6d6
| 92093 ||  || — || December 6, 1999 || Socorro || LINEAR || — || align=right | 11 km || 
|-id=094 bgcolor=#d6d6d6
| 92094 ||  || — || December 6, 1999 || Socorro || LINEAR || ALA || align=right | 12 km || 
|-id=095 bgcolor=#d6d6d6
| 92095 ||  || — || December 6, 1999 || Socorro || LINEAR || — || align=right | 7.1 km || 
|-id=096 bgcolor=#d6d6d6
| 92096 ||  || — || December 6, 1999 || Socorro || LINEAR || — || align=right | 4.3 km || 
|-id=097 bgcolor=#d6d6d6
| 92097 Aidai ||  ||  || December 3, 1999 || Kuma Kogen || A. Nakamura || THM || align=right | 7.6 km || 
|-id=098 bgcolor=#d6d6d6
| 92098 ||  || — || December 7, 1999 || Socorro || LINEAR || — || align=right | 5.9 km || 
|-id=099 bgcolor=#d6d6d6
| 92099 ||  || — || December 7, 1999 || Socorro || LINEAR || EOS || align=right | 4.8 km || 
|-id=100 bgcolor=#d6d6d6
| 92100 ||  || — || December 7, 1999 || Socorro || LINEAR || — || align=right | 5.7 km || 
|}

92101–92200 

|-bgcolor=#d6d6d6
| 92101 ||  || — || December 7, 1999 || Socorro || LINEAR || — || align=right | 6.8 km || 
|-id=102 bgcolor=#d6d6d6
| 92102 ||  || — || December 7, 1999 || Socorro || LINEAR || — || align=right | 7.5 km || 
|-id=103 bgcolor=#d6d6d6
| 92103 ||  || — || December 7, 1999 || Socorro || LINEAR || — || align=right | 6.5 km || 
|-id=104 bgcolor=#d6d6d6
| 92104 ||  || — || December 7, 1999 || Socorro || LINEAR || THM || align=right | 4.6 km || 
|-id=105 bgcolor=#d6d6d6
| 92105 ||  || — || December 7, 1999 || Socorro || LINEAR || THM || align=right | 5.7 km || 
|-id=106 bgcolor=#d6d6d6
| 92106 ||  || — || December 7, 1999 || Socorro || LINEAR || — || align=right | 9.6 km || 
|-id=107 bgcolor=#d6d6d6
| 92107 ||  || — || December 7, 1999 || Socorro || LINEAR || — || align=right | 6.3 km || 
|-id=108 bgcolor=#d6d6d6
| 92108 ||  || — || December 7, 1999 || Socorro || LINEAR || — || align=right | 9.1 km || 
|-id=109 bgcolor=#d6d6d6
| 92109 ||  || — || December 7, 1999 || Socorro || LINEAR || — || align=right | 5.9 km || 
|-id=110 bgcolor=#d6d6d6
| 92110 ||  || — || December 7, 1999 || Socorro || LINEAR || — || align=right | 5.5 km || 
|-id=111 bgcolor=#d6d6d6
| 92111 ||  || — || December 7, 1999 || Socorro || LINEAR || THM || align=right | 5.8 km || 
|-id=112 bgcolor=#d6d6d6
| 92112 ||  || — || December 7, 1999 || Socorro || LINEAR || THM || align=right | 7.2 km || 
|-id=113 bgcolor=#d6d6d6
| 92113 ||  || — || December 7, 1999 || Socorro || LINEAR || — || align=right | 6.3 km || 
|-id=114 bgcolor=#d6d6d6
| 92114 ||  || — || December 7, 1999 || Socorro || LINEAR || THM || align=right | 6.4 km || 
|-id=115 bgcolor=#d6d6d6
| 92115 ||  || — || December 7, 1999 || Socorro || LINEAR || THM || align=right | 5.9 km || 
|-id=116 bgcolor=#d6d6d6
| 92116 ||  || — || December 7, 1999 || Socorro || LINEAR || LIX || align=right | 10 km || 
|-id=117 bgcolor=#d6d6d6
| 92117 ||  || — || December 7, 1999 || Socorro || LINEAR || — || align=right | 7.6 km || 
|-id=118 bgcolor=#d6d6d6
| 92118 ||  || — || December 7, 1999 || Socorro || LINEAR || 7:4 || align=right | 7.5 km || 
|-id=119 bgcolor=#d6d6d6
| 92119 ||  || — || December 7, 1999 || Socorro || LINEAR || — || align=right | 8.2 km || 
|-id=120 bgcolor=#d6d6d6
| 92120 ||  || — || December 7, 1999 || Socorro || LINEAR || — || align=right | 6.8 km || 
|-id=121 bgcolor=#d6d6d6
| 92121 ||  || — || December 7, 1999 || Socorro || LINEAR || AEG || align=right | 9.5 km || 
|-id=122 bgcolor=#d6d6d6
| 92122 ||  || — || December 7, 1999 || Socorro || LINEAR || — || align=right | 13 km || 
|-id=123 bgcolor=#d6d6d6
| 92123 ||  || — || December 7, 1999 || Socorro || LINEAR || THM || align=right | 8.2 km || 
|-id=124 bgcolor=#d6d6d6
| 92124 ||  || — || December 7, 1999 || Campo Catino || Campo Catino Obs. || THM || align=right | 6.5 km || 
|-id=125 bgcolor=#d6d6d6
| 92125 ||  || — || December 10, 1999 || Oohira || N. Kawasato || — || align=right | 6.1 km || 
|-id=126 bgcolor=#d6d6d6
| 92126 ||  || — || December 4, 1999 || Catalina || CSS || — || align=right | 9.5 km || 
|-id=127 bgcolor=#d6d6d6
| 92127 ||  || — || December 4, 1999 || Catalina || CSS || — || align=right | 8.4 km || 
|-id=128 bgcolor=#d6d6d6
| 92128 ||  || — || December 4, 1999 || Catalina || CSS || — || align=right | 10 km || 
|-id=129 bgcolor=#d6d6d6
| 92129 ||  || — || December 4, 1999 || Catalina || CSS || HYG || align=right | 7.4 km || 
|-id=130 bgcolor=#d6d6d6
| 92130 ||  || — || December 4, 1999 || Catalina || CSS || EOS || align=right | 6.2 km || 
|-id=131 bgcolor=#d6d6d6
| 92131 ||  || — || December 4, 1999 || Catalina || CSS || VER || align=right | 7.8 km || 
|-id=132 bgcolor=#d6d6d6
| 92132 ||  || — || December 4, 1999 || Catalina || CSS || EOS || align=right | 5.5 km || 
|-id=133 bgcolor=#d6d6d6
| 92133 ||  || — || December 4, 1999 || Catalina || CSS || — || align=right | 8.4 km || 
|-id=134 bgcolor=#d6d6d6
| 92134 ||  || — || December 7, 1999 || Socorro || LINEAR || TIR || align=right | 6.5 km || 
|-id=135 bgcolor=#d6d6d6
| 92135 ||  || — || December 11, 1999 || Socorro || LINEAR || — || align=right | 8.7 km || 
|-id=136 bgcolor=#d6d6d6
| 92136 ||  || — || December 11, 1999 || Socorro || LINEAR || — || align=right | 4.2 km || 
|-id=137 bgcolor=#d6d6d6
| 92137 ||  || — || December 11, 1999 || Socorro || LINEAR || — || align=right | 6.7 km || 
|-id=138 bgcolor=#d6d6d6
| 92138 ||  || — || December 11, 1999 || Socorro || LINEAR || — || align=right | 6.5 km || 
|-id=139 bgcolor=#d6d6d6
| 92139 ||  || — || December 11, 1999 || Socorro || LINEAR || — || align=right | 6.7 km || 
|-id=140 bgcolor=#d6d6d6
| 92140 ||  || — || December 11, 1999 || Socorro || LINEAR || — || align=right | 8.3 km || 
|-id=141 bgcolor=#d6d6d6
| 92141 ||  || — || December 5, 1999 || Catalina || CSS || EOS || align=right | 4.2 km || 
|-id=142 bgcolor=#d6d6d6
| 92142 ||  || — || December 5, 1999 || Catalina || CSS || EOS || align=right | 4.1 km || 
|-id=143 bgcolor=#d6d6d6
| 92143 ||  || — || December 5, 1999 || Catalina || CSS || — || align=right | 7.7 km || 
|-id=144 bgcolor=#d6d6d6
| 92144 ||  || — || December 5, 1999 || Catalina || CSS || HYG || align=right | 7.0 km || 
|-id=145 bgcolor=#d6d6d6
| 92145 ||  || — || December 5, 1999 || Catalina || CSS || — || align=right | 8.7 km || 
|-id=146 bgcolor=#d6d6d6
| 92146 ||  || — || December 7, 1999 || Catalina || CSS || — || align=right | 5.5 km || 
|-id=147 bgcolor=#d6d6d6
| 92147 ||  || — || December 7, 1999 || Catalina || CSS || — || align=right | 7.3 km || 
|-id=148 bgcolor=#d6d6d6
| 92148 ||  || — || December 7, 1999 || Catalina || CSS || — || align=right | 6.4 km || 
|-id=149 bgcolor=#d6d6d6
| 92149 ||  || — || December 7, 1999 || Catalina || CSS || EOS || align=right | 4.6 km || 
|-id=150 bgcolor=#d6d6d6
| 92150 ||  || — || December 7, 1999 || Catalina || CSS || — || align=right | 4.6 km || 
|-id=151 bgcolor=#d6d6d6
| 92151 ||  || — || December 12, 1999 || Socorro || LINEAR || — || align=right | 4.6 km || 
|-id=152 bgcolor=#d6d6d6
| 92152 ||  || — || December 12, 1999 || Socorro || LINEAR || — || align=right | 7.4 km || 
|-id=153 bgcolor=#d6d6d6
| 92153 ||  || — || December 12, 1999 || Socorro || LINEAR || — || align=right | 7.2 km || 
|-id=154 bgcolor=#fefefe
| 92154 ||  || — || December 13, 1999 || Socorro || LINEAR || H || align=right | 1.1 km || 
|-id=155 bgcolor=#d6d6d6
| 92155 ||  || — || December 11, 1999 || Uccle || T. Pauwels || — || align=right | 8.4 km || 
|-id=156 bgcolor=#d6d6d6
| 92156 ||  || — || December 2, 1999 || Kitt Peak || Spacewatch || THM || align=right | 3.2 km || 
|-id=157 bgcolor=#d6d6d6
| 92157 ||  || — || December 3, 1999 || Kitt Peak || Spacewatch || KOR || align=right | 3.2 km || 
|-id=158 bgcolor=#FA8072
| 92158 ||  || — || December 10, 1999 || Socorro || LINEAR || H || align=right | 2.3 km || 
|-id=159 bgcolor=#fefefe
| 92159 ||  || — || December 12, 1999 || Socorro || LINEAR || H || align=right | 1.2 km || 
|-id=160 bgcolor=#d6d6d6
| 92160 ||  || — || December 15, 1999 || Oohira || T. Urata || — || align=right | 8.8 km || 
|-id=161 bgcolor=#d6d6d6
| 92161 ||  || — || December 6, 1999 || Kitt Peak || Spacewatch || — || align=right | 8.2 km || 
|-id=162 bgcolor=#d6d6d6
| 92162 ||  || — || December 9, 1999 || Anderson Mesa || LONEOS || EOS || align=right | 6.7 km || 
|-id=163 bgcolor=#d6d6d6
| 92163 ||  || — || December 7, 1999 || Socorro || LINEAR || — || align=right | 4.9 km || 
|-id=164 bgcolor=#d6d6d6
| 92164 ||  || — || December 7, 1999 || Socorro || LINEAR || EOS || align=right | 4.8 km || 
|-id=165 bgcolor=#d6d6d6
| 92165 ||  || — || December 8, 1999 || Socorro || LINEAR || HYG || align=right | 7.1 km || 
|-id=166 bgcolor=#fefefe
| 92166 ||  || — || December 13, 1999 || Socorro || LINEAR || H || align=right | 1.6 km || 
|-id=167 bgcolor=#d6d6d6
| 92167 ||  || — || December 10, 1999 || Socorro || LINEAR || EOS || align=right | 5.8 km || 
|-id=168 bgcolor=#d6d6d6
| 92168 ||  || — || December 10, 1999 || Socorro || LINEAR || — || align=right | 8.7 km || 
|-id=169 bgcolor=#d6d6d6
| 92169 ||  || — || December 12, 1999 || Socorro || LINEAR || ALA || align=right | 11 km || 
|-id=170 bgcolor=#d6d6d6
| 92170 ||  || — || December 12, 1999 || Socorro || LINEAR || — || align=right | 5.4 km || 
|-id=171 bgcolor=#d6d6d6
| 92171 ||  || — || December 12, 1999 || Socorro || LINEAR || — || align=right | 6.9 km || 
|-id=172 bgcolor=#d6d6d6
| 92172 ||  || — || December 12, 1999 || Socorro || LINEAR || URS || align=right | 7.7 km || 
|-id=173 bgcolor=#d6d6d6
| 92173 ||  || — || December 12, 1999 || Socorro || LINEAR || URS || align=right | 7.0 km || 
|-id=174 bgcolor=#d6d6d6
| 92174 ||  || — || December 12, 1999 || Socorro || LINEAR || — || align=right | 6.3 km || 
|-id=175 bgcolor=#d6d6d6
| 92175 ||  || — || December 12, 1999 || Socorro || LINEAR || — || align=right | 10 km || 
|-id=176 bgcolor=#d6d6d6
| 92176 ||  || — || December 12, 1999 || Socorro || LINEAR || — || align=right | 8.5 km || 
|-id=177 bgcolor=#d6d6d6
| 92177 ||  || — || December 12, 1999 || Socorro || LINEAR || — || align=right | 6.1 km || 
|-id=178 bgcolor=#d6d6d6
| 92178 ||  || — || December 12, 1999 || Socorro || LINEAR || — || align=right | 5.8 km || 
|-id=179 bgcolor=#d6d6d6
| 92179 ||  || — || December 12, 1999 || Socorro || LINEAR || ALA || align=right | 11 km || 
|-id=180 bgcolor=#d6d6d6
| 92180 ||  || — || December 12, 1999 || Socorro || LINEAR || EOS || align=right | 4.7 km || 
|-id=181 bgcolor=#d6d6d6
| 92181 ||  || — || December 12, 1999 || Socorro || LINEAR || — || align=right | 7.0 km || 
|-id=182 bgcolor=#d6d6d6
| 92182 ||  || — || December 12, 1999 || Socorro || LINEAR || — || align=right | 8.8 km || 
|-id=183 bgcolor=#d6d6d6
| 92183 ||  || — || December 12, 1999 || Socorro || LINEAR || — || align=right | 6.8 km || 
|-id=184 bgcolor=#d6d6d6
| 92184 ||  || — || December 12, 1999 || Socorro || LINEAR || 7:4 || align=right | 13 km || 
|-id=185 bgcolor=#d6d6d6
| 92185 ||  || — || December 12, 1999 || Socorro || LINEAR || LIX || align=right | 9.4 km || 
|-id=186 bgcolor=#d6d6d6
| 92186 ||  || — || December 13, 1999 || Socorro || LINEAR || — || align=right | 7.4 km || 
|-id=187 bgcolor=#d6d6d6
| 92187 ||  || — || December 13, 1999 || Socorro || LINEAR || — || align=right | 6.8 km || 
|-id=188 bgcolor=#d6d6d6
| 92188 ||  || — || December 14, 1999 || Socorro || LINEAR || HYG || align=right | 5.9 km || 
|-id=189 bgcolor=#d6d6d6
| 92189 ||  || — || December 14, 1999 || Socorro || LINEAR || — || align=right | 5.2 km || 
|-id=190 bgcolor=#d6d6d6
| 92190 ||  || — || December 13, 1999 || Kitt Peak || Spacewatch || — || align=right | 6.6 km || 
|-id=191 bgcolor=#d6d6d6
| 92191 ||  || — || December 15, 1999 || Socorro || LINEAR || HYG || align=right | 6.7 km || 
|-id=192 bgcolor=#d6d6d6
| 92192 ||  || — || December 15, 1999 || Socorro || LINEAR || — || align=right | 8.1 km || 
|-id=193 bgcolor=#d6d6d6
| 92193 ||  || — || December 7, 1999 || Anderson Mesa || LONEOS || — || align=right | 6.1 km || 
|-id=194 bgcolor=#d6d6d6
| 92194 ||  || — || December 7, 1999 || Anderson Mesa || LONEOS || — || align=right | 13 km || 
|-id=195 bgcolor=#d6d6d6
| 92195 ||  || — || December 7, 1999 || Anderson Mesa || LONEOS || HYG || align=right | 7.0 km || 
|-id=196 bgcolor=#d6d6d6
| 92196 ||  || — || December 4, 1999 || Anderson Mesa || LONEOS || — || align=right | 6.2 km || 
|-id=197 bgcolor=#d6d6d6
| 92197 ||  || — || December 4, 1999 || Anderson Mesa || LONEOS || URS || align=right | 6.1 km || 
|-id=198 bgcolor=#d6d6d6
| 92198 ||  || — || December 7, 1999 || Catalina || CSS || — || align=right | 6.9 km || 
|-id=199 bgcolor=#d6d6d6
| 92199 ||  || — || December 7, 1999 || Catalina || CSS || EMA || align=right | 9.4 km || 
|-id=200 bgcolor=#d6d6d6
| 92200 ||  || — || December 12, 1999 || Catalina || CSS || — || align=right | 5.9 km || 
|}

92201–92300 

|-bgcolor=#d6d6d6
| 92201 ||  || — || December 13, 1999 || Socorro || LINEAR || — || align=right | 8.0 km || 
|-id=202 bgcolor=#d6d6d6
| 92202 ||  || — || December 6, 1999 || Socorro || LINEAR || EOS || align=right | 5.1 km || 
|-id=203 bgcolor=#d6d6d6
| 92203 ||  || — || December 9, 1999 || Kitt Peak || Spacewatch || — || align=right | 4.6 km || 
|-id=204 bgcolor=#d6d6d6
| 92204 ||  || — || December 9, 1999 || Kitt Peak || Spacewatch || — || align=right | 4.0 km || 
|-id=205 bgcolor=#fefefe
| 92205 || 1999 YP || — || December 16, 1999 || Socorro || LINEAR || H || align=right | 1.3 km || 
|-id=206 bgcolor=#fefefe
| 92206 ||  || — || December 30, 1999 || Socorro || LINEAR || H || align=right | 1.2 km || 
|-id=207 bgcolor=#fefefe
| 92207 ||  || — || December 30, 1999 || Socorro || LINEAR || H || align=right | 1.4 km || 
|-id=208 bgcolor=#d6d6d6
| 92208 ||  || — || December 31, 1999 || Socorro || LINEAR || HYG || align=right | 5.7 km || 
|-id=209 bgcolor=#d6d6d6
| 92209 Pingtang ||  ||  || December 26, 1999 || Xinglong || SCAP || — || align=right | 8.3 km || 
|-id=210 bgcolor=#d6d6d6
| 92210 ||  || — || January 3, 2000 || Oizumi || T. Kobayashi || — || align=right | 12 km || 
|-id=211 bgcolor=#d6d6d6
| 92211 ||  || — || January 2, 2000 || Socorro || LINEAR || — || align=right | 11 km || 
|-id=212 bgcolor=#d6d6d6
| 92212 ||  || — || January 2, 2000 || Kitt Peak || Spacewatch || HYG || align=right | 7.9 km || 
|-id=213 bgcolor=#d6d6d6
| 92213 Kalina ||  ||  || January 5, 2000 || Kleť || M. Tichý || HYG || align=right | 5.8 km || 
|-id=214 bgcolor=#d6d6d6
| 92214 ||  || — || January 2, 2000 || Socorro || LINEAR || HYG || align=right | 7.6 km || 
|-id=215 bgcolor=#d6d6d6
| 92215 ||  || — || January 3, 2000 || Socorro || LINEAR || TIR || align=right | 6.8 km || 
|-id=216 bgcolor=#d6d6d6
| 92216 ||  || — || January 3, 2000 || Socorro || LINEAR || TEL || align=right | 3.5 km || 
|-id=217 bgcolor=#d6d6d6
| 92217 ||  || — || January 3, 2000 || Socorro || LINEAR || — || align=right | 7.1 km || 
|-id=218 bgcolor=#d6d6d6
| 92218 ||  || — || January 3, 2000 || Socorro || LINEAR || THM || align=right | 5.9 km || 
|-id=219 bgcolor=#d6d6d6
| 92219 ||  || — || January 3, 2000 || Socorro || LINEAR || THM || align=right | 4.9 km || 
|-id=220 bgcolor=#fefefe
| 92220 ||  || — || January 5, 2000 || Socorro || LINEAR || H || align=right | 1.2 km || 
|-id=221 bgcolor=#d6d6d6
| 92221 ||  || — || January 5, 2000 || Kitt Peak || Spacewatch || THM || align=right | 4.8 km || 
|-id=222 bgcolor=#fefefe
| 92222 ||  || — || January 3, 2000 || Socorro || LINEAR || H || align=right data-sort-value="0.96" | 960 m || 
|-id=223 bgcolor=#d6d6d6
| 92223 ||  || — || January 5, 2000 || Socorro || LINEAR || THM || align=right | 5.4 km || 
|-id=224 bgcolor=#d6d6d6
| 92224 ||  || — || January 5, 2000 || Socorro || LINEAR || — || align=right | 6.9 km || 
|-id=225 bgcolor=#d6d6d6
| 92225 ||  || — || January 5, 2000 || Socorro || LINEAR || — || align=right | 8.0 km || 
|-id=226 bgcolor=#fefefe
| 92226 ||  || — || January 3, 2000 || Socorro || LINEAR || H || align=right | 1.6 km || 
|-id=227 bgcolor=#fefefe
| 92227 ||  || — || January 4, 2000 || Socorro || LINEAR || H || align=right | 1.4 km || 
|-id=228 bgcolor=#d6d6d6
| 92228 ||  || — || January 5, 2000 || Socorro || LINEAR || — || align=right | 6.9 km || 
|-id=229 bgcolor=#d6d6d6
| 92229 ||  || — || January 5, 2000 || Socorro || LINEAR || — || align=right | 4.4 km || 
|-id=230 bgcolor=#d6d6d6
| 92230 ||  || — || January 5, 2000 || Socorro || LINEAR || — || align=right | 9.5 km || 
|-id=231 bgcolor=#d6d6d6
| 92231 ||  || — || January 5, 2000 || Socorro || LINEAR || — || align=right | 8.3 km || 
|-id=232 bgcolor=#d6d6d6
| 92232 ||  || — || January 5, 2000 || Socorro || LINEAR || — || align=right | 5.0 km || 
|-id=233 bgcolor=#d6d6d6
| 92233 ||  || — || January 5, 2000 || Socorro || LINEAR || — || align=right | 23 km || 
|-id=234 bgcolor=#d6d6d6
| 92234 ||  || — || January 5, 2000 || Socorro || LINEAR || — || align=right | 8.3 km || 
|-id=235 bgcolor=#d6d6d6
| 92235 ||  || — || January 5, 2000 || Socorro || LINEAR || HYG || align=right | 6.1 km || 
|-id=236 bgcolor=#d6d6d6
| 92236 ||  || — || January 5, 2000 || Socorro || LINEAR || HYG || align=right | 6.6 km || 
|-id=237 bgcolor=#d6d6d6
| 92237 ||  || — || January 5, 2000 || Socorro || LINEAR || HYG || align=right | 6.8 km || 
|-id=238 bgcolor=#d6d6d6
| 92238 ||  || — || January 2, 2000 || Socorro || LINEAR || EOS || align=right | 4.7 km || 
|-id=239 bgcolor=#d6d6d6
| 92239 ||  || — || January 5, 2000 || Socorro || LINEAR || — || align=right | 9.3 km || 
|-id=240 bgcolor=#fefefe
| 92240 ||  || — || January 7, 2000 || Socorro || LINEAR || H || align=right | 1.1 km || 
|-id=241 bgcolor=#E9E9E9
| 92241 ||  || — || January 6, 2000 || Socorro || LINEAR || GEF || align=right | 3.3 km || 
|-id=242 bgcolor=#d6d6d6
| 92242 ||  || — || January 7, 2000 || Socorro || LINEAR || BRA || align=right | 6.0 km || 
|-id=243 bgcolor=#d6d6d6
| 92243 ||  || — || January 7, 2000 || Socorro || LINEAR || — || align=right | 12 km || 
|-id=244 bgcolor=#d6d6d6
| 92244 ||  || — || January 7, 2000 || Socorro || LINEAR || URS || align=right | 8.6 km || 
|-id=245 bgcolor=#d6d6d6
| 92245 ||  || — || January 7, 2000 || Socorro || LINEAR || — || align=right | 7.0 km || 
|-id=246 bgcolor=#d6d6d6
| 92246 ||  || — || January 2, 2000 || Socorro || LINEAR || — || align=right | 9.0 km || 
|-id=247 bgcolor=#d6d6d6
| 92247 ||  || — || January 2, 2000 || Socorro || LINEAR || — || align=right | 8.3 km || 
|-id=248 bgcolor=#d6d6d6
| 92248 ||  || — || January 2, 2000 || Socorro || LINEAR || — || align=right | 9.2 km || 
|-id=249 bgcolor=#d6d6d6
| 92249 ||  || — || January 7, 2000 || Socorro || LINEAR || ALA || align=right | 8.7 km || 
|-id=250 bgcolor=#d6d6d6
| 92250 ||  || — || January 8, 2000 || Socorro || LINEAR || — || align=right | 8.2 km || 
|-id=251 bgcolor=#d6d6d6
| 92251 Kuconis ||  ||  || January 8, 2000 || Socorro || LINEAR || — || align=right | 9.6 km || 
|-id=252 bgcolor=#d6d6d6
| 92252 ||  || — || January 8, 2000 || Socorro || LINEAR || — || align=right | 9.1 km || 
|-id=253 bgcolor=#d6d6d6
| 92253 ||  || — || January 8, 2000 || Socorro || LINEAR || — || align=right | 4.8 km || 
|-id=254 bgcolor=#d6d6d6
| 92254 ||  || — || January 9, 2000 || Socorro || LINEAR || — || align=right | 7.8 km || 
|-id=255 bgcolor=#E9E9E9
| 92255 ||  || — || January 9, 2000 || Socorro || LINEAR || HNS || align=right | 4.7 km || 
|-id=256 bgcolor=#d6d6d6
| 92256 ||  || — || January 9, 2000 || Socorro || LINEAR || — || align=right | 6.2 km || 
|-id=257 bgcolor=#d6d6d6
| 92257 ||  || — || January 5, 2000 || Socorro || LINEAR || — || align=right | 7.5 km || 
|-id=258 bgcolor=#d6d6d6
| 92258 ||  || — || January 9, 2000 || Socorro || LINEAR || — || align=right | 8.2 km || 
|-id=259 bgcolor=#d6d6d6
| 92259 ||  || — || January 9, 2000 || Socorro || LINEAR || LUT || align=right | 8.4 km || 
|-id=260 bgcolor=#d6d6d6
| 92260 ||  || — || January 21, 2000 || Socorro || LINEAR || — || align=right | 6.1 km || 
|-id=261 bgcolor=#d6d6d6
| 92261 ||  || — || January 28, 2000 || Socorro || LINEAR || — || align=right | 10 km || 
|-id=262 bgcolor=#d6d6d6
| 92262 ||  || — || January 31, 2000 || Oizumi || T. Kobayashi || SYL7:4 || align=right | 11 km || 
|-id=263 bgcolor=#d6d6d6
| 92263 ||  || — || January 30, 2000 || Socorro || LINEAR || — || align=right | 6.5 km || 
|-id=264 bgcolor=#fefefe
| 92264 ||  || — || January 29, 2000 || Socorro || LINEAR || H || align=right | 1.1 km || 
|-id=265 bgcolor=#d6d6d6
| 92265 ||  || — || January 26, 2000 || Farra d'Isonzo || Farra d'Isonzo || 7:4 || align=right | 7.2 km || 
|-id=266 bgcolor=#fefefe
| 92266 ||  || — || January 29, 2000 || Socorro || LINEAR || H || align=right | 1.1 km || 
|-id=267 bgcolor=#d6d6d6
| 92267 ||  || — || January 30, 2000 || Socorro || LINEAR || — || align=right | 6.3 km || 
|-id=268 bgcolor=#fefefe
| 92268 ||  || — || January 27, 2000 || Kitt Peak || Spacewatch || — || align=right | 1.1 km || 
|-id=269 bgcolor=#d6d6d6
| 92269 ||  || — || February 2, 2000 || Oizumi || T. Kobayashi || — || align=right | 11 km || 
|-id=270 bgcolor=#d6d6d6
| 92270 ||  || — || February 2, 2000 || Socorro || LINEAR || — || align=right | 2.8 km || 
|-id=271 bgcolor=#fefefe
| 92271 ||  || — || February 2, 2000 || Socorro || LINEAR || H || align=right | 1.8 km || 
|-id=272 bgcolor=#d6d6d6
| 92272 ||  || — || February 2, 2000 || Socorro || LINEAR || HIL3:2 || align=right | 14 km || 
|-id=273 bgcolor=#d6d6d6
| 92273 ||  || — || February 4, 2000 || Socorro || LINEAR || MEL || align=right | 8.4 km || 
|-id=274 bgcolor=#fefefe
| 92274 ||  || — || February 4, 2000 || Socorro || LINEAR || — || align=right | 3.5 km || 
|-id=275 bgcolor=#fefefe
| 92275 ||  || — || February 4, 2000 || Socorro || LINEAR || — || align=right | 1.5 km || 
|-id=276 bgcolor=#fefefe
| 92276 ||  || — || February 10, 2000 || Kitt Peak || Spacewatch || — || align=right data-sort-value="0.98" | 980 m || 
|-id=277 bgcolor=#d6d6d6
| 92277 ||  || — || February 5, 2000 || Catalina || CSS || — || align=right | 4.6 km || 
|-id=278 bgcolor=#FA8072
| 92278 ||  || — || February 5, 2000 || Kitt Peak || M. W. Buie || — || align=right data-sort-value="0.92" | 920 m || 
|-id=279 bgcolor=#d6d6d6
| 92279 Bindiluca || 2000 DG ||  || February 22, 2000 || San Marcello || L. Tesi || — || align=right | 9.2 km || 
|-id=280 bgcolor=#fefefe
| 92280 ||  || — || February 25, 2000 || Socorro || LINEAR || H || align=right | 2.2 km || 
|-id=281 bgcolor=#d6d6d6
| 92281 ||  || — || February 29, 2000 || Prescott || P. G. Comba || SHU3:2 || align=right | 11 km || 
|-id=282 bgcolor=#d6d6d6
| 92282 ||  || — || February 29, 2000 || Socorro || LINEAR || THB || align=right | 6.4 km || 
|-id=283 bgcolor=#d6d6d6
| 92283 ||  || — || February 29, 2000 || Socorro || LINEAR || 3:2 || align=right | 11 km || 
|-id=284 bgcolor=#d6d6d6
| 92284 ||  || — || February 29, 2000 || Socorro || LINEAR || 3:2 || align=right | 6.3 km || 
|-id=285 bgcolor=#fefefe
| 92285 || 2000 EW || — || March 3, 2000 || Višnjan Observatory || K. Korlević || — || align=right | 1.6 km || 
|-id=286 bgcolor=#fefefe
| 92286 ||  || — || March 3, 2000 || Kitt Peak || Spacewatch || — || align=right | 1.1 km || 
|-id=287 bgcolor=#d6d6d6
| 92287 ||  || — || March 4, 2000 || Socorro || LINEAR || HIL3:2slow || align=right | 13 km || 
|-id=288 bgcolor=#fefefe
| 92288 ||  || — || March 8, 2000 || Socorro || LINEAR || — || align=right | 1.2 km || 
|-id=289 bgcolor=#fefefe
| 92289 ||  || — || March 9, 2000 || Socorro || LINEAR || FLO || align=right | 1.3 km || 
|-id=290 bgcolor=#fefefe
| 92290 ||  || — || March 10, 2000 || Socorro || LINEAR || — || align=right | 1.0 km || 
|-id=291 bgcolor=#fefefe
| 92291 ||  || — || March 8, 2000 || Socorro || LINEAR || — || align=right | 2.1 km || 
|-id=292 bgcolor=#fefefe
| 92292 ||  || — || March 9, 2000 || Socorro || LINEAR || H || align=right | 1.9 km || 
|-id=293 bgcolor=#fefefe
| 92293 ||  || — || March 11, 2000 || Anderson Mesa || LONEOS || — || align=right | 1.4 km || 
|-id=294 bgcolor=#fefefe
| 92294 ||  || — || March 9, 2000 || Socorro || LINEAR || — || align=right | 1.8 km || 
|-id=295 bgcolor=#fefefe
| 92295 ||  || — || March 9, 2000 || Socorro || LINEAR || — || align=right | 1.6 km || 
|-id=296 bgcolor=#fefefe
| 92296 ||  || — || March 11, 2000 || Socorro || LINEAR || — || align=right | 1.4 km || 
|-id=297 bgcolor=#d6d6d6
| 92297 Monrad ||  ||  || March 10, 2000 || Catalina || CSS || — || align=right | 16 km || 
|-id=298 bgcolor=#fefefe
| 92298 ||  || — || March 3, 2000 || Socorro || LINEAR || — || align=right | 1.4 km || 
|-id=299 bgcolor=#d6d6d6
| 92299 ||  || — || March 5, 2000 || Socorro || LINEAR || — || align=right | 8.6 km || 
|-id=300 bgcolor=#fefefe
| 92300 Hagelin ||  ||  || March 1, 2000 || Catalina || CSS || — || align=right | 1.4 km || 
|}

92301–92400 

|-bgcolor=#fefefe
| 92301 || 2000 FG || — || March 25, 2000 || Prescott || P. G. Comba || FLO || align=right | 1.2 km || 
|-id=302 bgcolor=#fefefe
| 92302 ||  || — || March 27, 2000 || Socorro || LINEAR || H || align=right | 1.4 km || 
|-id=303 bgcolor=#fefefe
| 92303 ||  || — || March 28, 2000 || Socorro || LINEAR || — || align=right | 1.5 km || 
|-id=304 bgcolor=#fefefe
| 92304 ||  || — || March 28, 2000 || Socorro || LINEAR || FLO || align=right | 1.3 km || 
|-id=305 bgcolor=#fefefe
| 92305 ||  || — || March 29, 2000 || Socorro || LINEAR || — || align=right | 1.5 km || 
|-id=306 bgcolor=#fefefe
| 92306 ||  || — || March 27, 2000 || Anderson Mesa || LONEOS || — || align=right | 1.7 km || 
|-id=307 bgcolor=#fefefe
| 92307 ||  || — || March 29, 2000 || Socorro || LINEAR || — || align=right | 1.5 km || 
|-id=308 bgcolor=#fefefe
| 92308 ||  || — || March 29, 2000 || Socorro || LINEAR || — || align=right | 1.6 km || 
|-id=309 bgcolor=#fefefe
| 92309 ||  || — || March 29, 2000 || Socorro || LINEAR || — || align=right | 1.4 km || 
|-id=310 bgcolor=#fefefe
| 92310 ||  || — || March 29, 2000 || Socorro || LINEAR || — || align=right | 1.5 km || 
|-id=311 bgcolor=#fefefe
| 92311 ||  || — || March 29, 2000 || Socorro || LINEAR || — || align=right | 3.0 km || 
|-id=312 bgcolor=#fefefe
| 92312 ||  || — || March 29, 2000 || Socorro || LINEAR || — || align=right | 1.7 km || 
|-id=313 bgcolor=#fefefe
| 92313 ||  || — || March 29, 2000 || Socorro || LINEAR || — || align=right | 1.8 km || 
|-id=314 bgcolor=#fefefe
| 92314 ||  || — || April 3, 2000 || Reedy Creek || J. Broughton || PHO || align=right | 2.5 km || 
|-id=315 bgcolor=#fefefe
| 92315 ||  || — || April 7, 2000 || Socorro || LINEAR || FLO || align=right | 1.1 km || 
|-id=316 bgcolor=#fefefe
| 92316 ||  || — || April 4, 2000 || Socorro || LINEAR || — || align=right | 1.2 km || 
|-id=317 bgcolor=#fefefe
| 92317 ||  || — || April 5, 2000 || Socorro || LINEAR || — || align=right | 1.4 km || 
|-id=318 bgcolor=#fefefe
| 92318 ||  || — || April 5, 2000 || Socorro || LINEAR || — || align=right | 1.2 km || 
|-id=319 bgcolor=#fefefe
| 92319 ||  || — || April 5, 2000 || Socorro || LINEAR || — || align=right | 1.2 km || 
|-id=320 bgcolor=#fefefe
| 92320 ||  || — || April 5, 2000 || Socorro || LINEAR || — || align=right | 1.5 km || 
|-id=321 bgcolor=#fefefe
| 92321 ||  || — || April 5, 2000 || Socorro || LINEAR || — || align=right | 1.2 km || 
|-id=322 bgcolor=#fefefe
| 92322 ||  || — || April 5, 2000 || Socorro || LINEAR || — || align=right | 1.2 km || 
|-id=323 bgcolor=#fefefe
| 92323 ||  || — || April 5, 2000 || Socorro || LINEAR || — || align=right | 1.7 km || 
|-id=324 bgcolor=#fefefe
| 92324 ||  || — || April 5, 2000 || Socorro || LINEAR || FLO || align=right | 1.5 km || 
|-id=325 bgcolor=#fefefe
| 92325 ||  || — || April 5, 2000 || Socorro || LINEAR || — || align=right | 1.5 km || 
|-id=326 bgcolor=#d6d6d6
| 92326 ||  || — || April 5, 2000 || Socorro || LINEAR || 3:2 || align=right | 11 km || 
|-id=327 bgcolor=#fefefe
| 92327 ||  || — || April 5, 2000 || Socorro || LINEAR || — || align=right | 1.6 km || 
|-id=328 bgcolor=#fefefe
| 92328 ||  || — || April 5, 2000 || Socorro || LINEAR || — || align=right | 1.4 km || 
|-id=329 bgcolor=#fefefe
| 92329 ||  || — || April 5, 2000 || Socorro || LINEAR || — || align=right | 2.2 km || 
|-id=330 bgcolor=#fefefe
| 92330 ||  || — || April 5, 2000 || Socorro || LINEAR || — || align=right | 1.4 km || 
|-id=331 bgcolor=#fefefe
| 92331 ||  || — || April 5, 2000 || Socorro || LINEAR || PHO || align=right | 2.2 km || 
|-id=332 bgcolor=#fefefe
| 92332 ||  || — || April 5, 2000 || Socorro || LINEAR || — || align=right | 1.6 km || 
|-id=333 bgcolor=#fefefe
| 92333 ||  || — || April 5, 2000 || Socorro || LINEAR || — || align=right | 1.7 km || 
|-id=334 bgcolor=#fefefe
| 92334 ||  || — || April 5, 2000 || Socorro || LINEAR || — || align=right | 1.2 km || 
|-id=335 bgcolor=#fefefe
| 92335 ||  || — || April 6, 2000 || Socorro || LINEAR || — || align=right | 1.3 km || 
|-id=336 bgcolor=#fefefe
| 92336 ||  || — || April 7, 2000 || Socorro || LINEAR || H || align=right | 1.6 km || 
|-id=337 bgcolor=#fefefe
| 92337 ||  || — || April 6, 2000 || Socorro || LINEAR || — || align=right | 1.7 km || 
|-id=338 bgcolor=#fefefe
| 92338 ||  || — || April 6, 2000 || Socorro || LINEAR || — || align=right | 1.8 km || 
|-id=339 bgcolor=#fefefe
| 92339 ||  || — || April 7, 2000 || Socorro || LINEAR || — || align=right | 2.0 km || 
|-id=340 bgcolor=#fefefe
| 92340 ||  || — || April 7, 2000 || Socorro || LINEAR || — || align=right | 1.4 km || 
|-id=341 bgcolor=#fefefe
| 92341 ||  || — || April 2, 2000 || Anderson Mesa || LONEOS || — || align=right | 1.5 km || 
|-id=342 bgcolor=#fefefe
| 92342 ||  || — || April 12, 2000 || Socorro || LINEAR || — || align=right | 2.1 km || 
|-id=343 bgcolor=#fefefe
| 92343 ||  || — || April 7, 2000 || Anderson Mesa || LONEOS || — || align=right | 1.2 km || 
|-id=344 bgcolor=#d6d6d6
| 92344 ||  || — || April 4, 2000 || Anderson Mesa || LONEOS || 3:2 || align=right | 11 km || 
|-id=345 bgcolor=#fefefe
| 92345 ||  || — || April 7, 2000 || Anderson Mesa || LONEOS || — || align=right | 2.8 km || 
|-id=346 bgcolor=#fefefe
| 92346 ||  || — || April 7, 2000 || Socorro || LINEAR || — || align=right | 3.8 km || 
|-id=347 bgcolor=#fefefe
| 92347 ||  || — || April 7, 2000 || Anderson Mesa || LONEOS || — || align=right | 1.3 km || 
|-id=348 bgcolor=#fefefe
| 92348 ||  || — || April 4, 2000 || Anderson Mesa || LONEOS || — || align=right | 3.1 km || 
|-id=349 bgcolor=#fefefe
| 92349 ||  || — || April 26, 2000 || Kitt Peak || Spacewatch || FLO || align=right data-sort-value="0.98" | 980 m || 
|-id=350 bgcolor=#fefefe
| 92350 ||  || — || April 28, 2000 || Prescott || P. G. Comba || — || align=right | 1.8 km || 
|-id=351 bgcolor=#fefefe
| 92351 ||  || — || April 24, 2000 || Kitt Peak || Spacewatch || V || align=right data-sort-value="0.86" | 860 m || 
|-id=352 bgcolor=#fefefe
| 92352 ||  || — || April 28, 2000 || Socorro || LINEAR || — || align=right | 1.2 km || 
|-id=353 bgcolor=#d6d6d6
| 92353 ||  || — || April 27, 2000 || Socorro || LINEAR || EUP || align=right | 11 km || 
|-id=354 bgcolor=#fefefe
| 92354 ||  || — || April 29, 2000 || Prescott || P. G. Comba || — || align=right | 1.3 km || 
|-id=355 bgcolor=#fefefe
| 92355 ||  || — || April 27, 2000 || Socorro || LINEAR || — || align=right | 1.7 km || 
|-id=356 bgcolor=#fefefe
| 92356 ||  || — || April 27, 2000 || Socorro || LINEAR || — || align=right | 1.4 km || 
|-id=357 bgcolor=#fefefe
| 92357 ||  || — || April 28, 2000 || Socorro || LINEAR || FLO || align=right | 1.4 km || 
|-id=358 bgcolor=#fefefe
| 92358 ||  || — || April 30, 2000 || Socorro || LINEAR || — || align=right | 1.4 km || 
|-id=359 bgcolor=#FA8072
| 92359 ||  || — || April 29, 2000 || Socorro || LINEAR || — || align=right | 1.9 km || 
|-id=360 bgcolor=#fefefe
| 92360 ||  || — || April 24, 2000 || Anderson Mesa || LONEOS || — || align=right | 1.7 km || 
|-id=361 bgcolor=#fefefe
| 92361 ||  || — || April 29, 2000 || Socorro || LINEAR || PHO || align=right | 2.4 km || 
|-id=362 bgcolor=#fefefe
| 92362 ||  || — || April 28, 2000 || Socorro || LINEAR || — || align=right | 1.7 km || 
|-id=363 bgcolor=#fefefe
| 92363 ||  || — || April 29, 2000 || Socorro || LINEAR || NYS || align=right | 1.4 km || 
|-id=364 bgcolor=#fefefe
| 92364 ||  || — || April 29, 2000 || Socorro || LINEAR || — || align=right | 1.7 km || 
|-id=365 bgcolor=#fefefe
| 92365 ||  || — || April 29, 2000 || Socorro || LINEAR || — || align=right | 2.2 km || 
|-id=366 bgcolor=#fefefe
| 92366 ||  || — || April 28, 2000 || Socorro || LINEAR || — || align=right | 1.3 km || 
|-id=367 bgcolor=#fefefe
| 92367 ||  || — || April 29, 2000 || Socorro || LINEAR || — || align=right | 1.4 km || 
|-id=368 bgcolor=#fefefe
| 92368 ||  || — || April 29, 2000 || Socorro || LINEAR || — || align=right | 1.4 km || 
|-id=369 bgcolor=#fefefe
| 92369 ||  || — || April 29, 2000 || Socorro || LINEAR || — || align=right | 1.4 km || 
|-id=370 bgcolor=#fefefe
| 92370 ||  || — || April 29, 2000 || Socorro || LINEAR || NYS || align=right | 3.1 km || 
|-id=371 bgcolor=#fefefe
| 92371 ||  || — || April 29, 2000 || Socorro || LINEAR || — || align=right | 1.5 km || 
|-id=372 bgcolor=#fefefe
| 92372 ||  || — || April 29, 2000 || Socorro || LINEAR || — || align=right | 1.8 km || 
|-id=373 bgcolor=#fefefe
| 92373 ||  || — || April 29, 2000 || Socorro || LINEAR || FLO || align=right | 1.8 km || 
|-id=374 bgcolor=#fefefe
| 92374 ||  || — || April 29, 2000 || Socorro || LINEAR || — || align=right | 1.4 km || 
|-id=375 bgcolor=#fefefe
| 92375 ||  || — || April 24, 2000 || Anderson Mesa || LONEOS || — || align=right | 1.6 km || 
|-id=376 bgcolor=#fefefe
| 92376 ||  || — || April 24, 2000 || Kitt Peak || Spacewatch || — || align=right | 2.7 km || 
|-id=377 bgcolor=#fefefe
| 92377 ||  || — || April 25, 2000 || Anderson Mesa || LONEOS || — || align=right | 1.4 km || 
|-id=378 bgcolor=#fefefe
| 92378 ||  || — || April 25, 2000 || Anderson Mesa || LONEOS || — || align=right | 1.2 km || 
|-id=379 bgcolor=#fefefe
| 92379 ||  || — || April 28, 2000 || Kitt Peak || Spacewatch || FLO || align=right | 1.3 km || 
|-id=380 bgcolor=#fefefe
| 92380 ||  || — || April 28, 2000 || Kitt Peak || Spacewatch || — || align=right | 1.3 km || 
|-id=381 bgcolor=#fefefe
| 92381 ||  || — || April 26, 2000 || Anderson Mesa || LONEOS || NYS || align=right | 1.0 km || 
|-id=382 bgcolor=#fefefe
| 92382 ||  || — || April 26, 2000 || Kitt Peak || Spacewatch || — || align=right | 1.0 km || 
|-id=383 bgcolor=#FA8072
| 92383 ||  || — || April 27, 2000 || Socorro || LINEAR || PHO || align=right | 2.0 km || 
|-id=384 bgcolor=#fefefe
| 92384 ||  || — || April 27, 2000 || Socorro || LINEAR || V || align=right | 1.4 km || 
|-id=385 bgcolor=#fefefe
| 92385 ||  || — || April 29, 2000 || Socorro || LINEAR || — || align=right | 1.4 km || 
|-id=386 bgcolor=#fefefe
| 92386 ||  || — || April 30, 2000 || Haleakala || NEAT || — || align=right | 1.3 km || 
|-id=387 bgcolor=#fefefe
| 92387 ||  || — || April 29, 2000 || Socorro || LINEAR || — || align=right | 1.1 km || 
|-id=388 bgcolor=#fefefe
| 92388 || 2000 JP || — || May 1, 2000 || Socorro || LINEAR || FLO || align=right | 1.6 km || 
|-id=389 bgcolor=#fefefe
| 92389 Gretskij ||  ||  || May 3, 2000 || Ondřejov || P. Pravec, P. Kušnirák || — || align=right | 1.3 km || 
|-id=390 bgcolor=#fefefe
| 92390 ||  || — || May 1, 2000 || Socorro || LINEAR || — || align=right | 1.5 km || 
|-id=391 bgcolor=#fefefe
| 92391 ||  || — || May 1, 2000 || Haleakala || NEAT || ERI || align=right | 3.8 km || 
|-id=392 bgcolor=#fefefe
| 92392 ||  || — || May 3, 2000 || Socorro || LINEAR || — || align=right | 1.4 km || 
|-id=393 bgcolor=#fefefe
| 92393 ||  || — || May 9, 2000 || Socorro || LINEAR || — || align=right | 1.5 km || 
|-id=394 bgcolor=#fefefe
| 92394 ||  || — || May 6, 2000 || Socorro || LINEAR || FLO || align=right | 3.6 km || 
|-id=395 bgcolor=#fefefe
| 92395 ||  || — || May 6, 2000 || Socorro || LINEAR || — || align=right | 1.4 km || 
|-id=396 bgcolor=#fefefe
| 92396 ||  || — || May 6, 2000 || Socorro || LINEAR || FLO || align=right | 1.2 km || 
|-id=397 bgcolor=#fefefe
| 92397 ||  || — || May 6, 2000 || Socorro || LINEAR || — || align=right | 3.0 km || 
|-id=398 bgcolor=#fefefe
| 92398 ||  || — || May 7, 2000 || Socorro || LINEAR || FLO || align=right | 1.9 km || 
|-id=399 bgcolor=#fefefe
| 92399 ||  || — || May 7, 2000 || Socorro || LINEAR || — || align=right | 1.6 km || 
|-id=400 bgcolor=#fefefe
| 92400 ||  || — || May 7, 2000 || Socorro || LINEAR || — || align=right | 1.9 km || 
|}

92401–92500 

|-bgcolor=#fefefe
| 92401 ||  || — || May 7, 2000 || Socorro || LINEAR || — || align=right | 1.5 km || 
|-id=402 bgcolor=#fefefe
| 92402 ||  || — || May 7, 2000 || Socorro || LINEAR || — || align=right | 1.5 km || 
|-id=403 bgcolor=#fefefe
| 92403 ||  || — || May 7, 2000 || Socorro || LINEAR || FLO || align=right | 1.4 km || 
|-id=404 bgcolor=#fefefe
| 92404 ||  || — || May 7, 2000 || Socorro || LINEAR || — || align=right | 1.4 km || 
|-id=405 bgcolor=#fefefe
| 92405 ||  || — || May 7, 2000 || Socorro || LINEAR || V || align=right | 1.2 km || 
|-id=406 bgcolor=#fefefe
| 92406 ||  || — || May 7, 2000 || Socorro || LINEAR || FLO || align=right | 2.2 km || 
|-id=407 bgcolor=#fefefe
| 92407 ||  || — || May 7, 2000 || Socorro || LINEAR || NYS || align=right | 2.9 km || 
|-id=408 bgcolor=#fefefe
| 92408 ||  || — || May 7, 2000 || Socorro || LINEAR || FLO || align=right | 1.5 km || 
|-id=409 bgcolor=#fefefe
| 92409 ||  || — || May 7, 2000 || Socorro || LINEAR || FLO || align=right | 1.6 km || 
|-id=410 bgcolor=#fefefe
| 92410 ||  || — || May 7, 2000 || Socorro || LINEAR || — || align=right | 1.5 km || 
|-id=411 bgcolor=#fefefe
| 92411 ||  || — || May 7, 2000 || Socorro || LINEAR || FLO || align=right | 1.8 km || 
|-id=412 bgcolor=#fefefe
| 92412 ||  || — || May 7, 2000 || Socorro || LINEAR || — || align=right | 1.5 km || 
|-id=413 bgcolor=#fefefe
| 92413 ||  || — || May 7, 2000 || Socorro || LINEAR || — || align=right | 1.2 km || 
|-id=414 bgcolor=#fefefe
| 92414 ||  || — || May 6, 2000 || Socorro || LINEAR || FLO || align=right | 1.2 km || 
|-id=415 bgcolor=#fefefe
| 92415 ||  || — || May 7, 2000 || Socorro || LINEAR || — || align=right | 1.4 km || 
|-id=416 bgcolor=#fefefe
| 92416 ||  || — || May 7, 2000 || Socorro || LINEAR || — || align=right | 1.2 km || 
|-id=417 bgcolor=#fefefe
| 92417 ||  || — || May 7, 2000 || Socorro || LINEAR || — || align=right | 2.0 km || 
|-id=418 bgcolor=#fefefe
| 92418 ||  || — || May 7, 2000 || Socorro || LINEAR || — || align=right | 1.5 km || 
|-id=419 bgcolor=#fefefe
| 92419 ||  || — || May 7, 2000 || Socorro || LINEAR || NYS || align=right | 1.2 km || 
|-id=420 bgcolor=#fefefe
| 92420 ||  || — || May 9, 2000 || Socorro || LINEAR || FLO || align=right | 1.8 km || 
|-id=421 bgcolor=#fefefe
| 92421 ||  || — || May 9, 2000 || Socorro || LINEAR || FLO || align=right | 3.0 km || 
|-id=422 bgcolor=#fefefe
| 92422 ||  || — || May 9, 2000 || Socorro || LINEAR || — || align=right | 2.0 km || 
|-id=423 bgcolor=#fefefe
| 92423 ||  || — || May 9, 2000 || Socorro || LINEAR || FLO || align=right | 1.2 km || 
|-id=424 bgcolor=#fefefe
| 92424 ||  || — || May 9, 2000 || Socorro || LINEAR || — || align=right | 1.7 km || 
|-id=425 bgcolor=#fefefe
| 92425 ||  || — || May 6, 2000 || Socorro || LINEAR || — || align=right | 1.3 km || 
|-id=426 bgcolor=#fefefe
| 92426 ||  || — || May 6, 2000 || Socorro || LINEAR || — || align=right | 2.2 km || 
|-id=427 bgcolor=#fefefe
| 92427 ||  || — || May 6, 2000 || Socorro || LINEAR || — || align=right | 1.8 km || 
|-id=428 bgcolor=#fefefe
| 92428 ||  || — || May 7, 2000 || Socorro || LINEAR || — || align=right | 1.4 km || 
|-id=429 bgcolor=#fefefe
| 92429 ||  || — || May 9, 2000 || Socorro || LINEAR || — || align=right | 1.7 km || 
|-id=430 bgcolor=#fefefe
| 92430 ||  || — || May 10, 2000 || Socorro || LINEAR || NYS || align=right | 1.7 km || 
|-id=431 bgcolor=#fefefe
| 92431 ||  || — || May 6, 2000 || Socorro || LINEAR || — || align=right | 1.6 km || 
|-id=432 bgcolor=#fefefe
| 92432 ||  || — || May 6, 2000 || Socorro || LINEAR || — || align=right | 1.4 km || 
|-id=433 bgcolor=#fefefe
| 92433 ||  || — || May 6, 2000 || Socorro || LINEAR || — || align=right | 4.9 km || 
|-id=434 bgcolor=#fefefe
| 92434 ||  || — || May 1, 2000 || Anderson Mesa || LONEOS || — || align=right | 1.4 km || 
|-id=435 bgcolor=#fefefe
| 92435 ||  || — || May 2, 2000 || Kitt Peak || Spacewatch || — || align=right | 1.4 km || 
|-id=436 bgcolor=#fefefe
| 92436 ||  || — || May 7, 2000 || Socorro || LINEAR || — || align=right | 1.7 km || 
|-id=437 bgcolor=#fefefe
| 92437 ||  || — || May 1, 2000 || Haleakala || NEAT || — || align=right | 1.4 km || 
|-id=438 bgcolor=#fefefe
| 92438 ||  || — || May 2, 2000 || Anderson Mesa || LONEOS || — || align=right | 1.6 km || 
|-id=439 bgcolor=#fefefe
| 92439 || 2000 KD || — || May 24, 2000 || Kitt Peak || Spacewatch || — || align=right | 1.6 km || 
|-id=440 bgcolor=#fefefe
| 92440 ||  || — || May 24, 2000 || Ondřejov || L. Kotková || — || align=right | 1.6 km || 
|-id=441 bgcolor=#fefefe
| 92441 ||  || — || May 26, 2000 || Črni Vrh || Črni Vrh || — || align=right | 1.7 km || 
|-id=442 bgcolor=#fefefe
| 92442 ||  || — || May 27, 2000 || Reedy Creek || J. Broughton || — || align=right | 1.8 km || 
|-id=443 bgcolor=#fefefe
| 92443 ||  || — || May 27, 2000 || Socorro || LINEAR || — || align=right | 2.6 km || 
|-id=444 bgcolor=#fefefe
| 92444 ||  || — || May 28, 2000 || Socorro || LINEAR || — || align=right | 2.0 km || 
|-id=445 bgcolor=#fefefe
| 92445 ||  || — || May 28, 2000 || Socorro || LINEAR || — || align=right | 2.4 km || 
|-id=446 bgcolor=#fefefe
| 92446 ||  || — || May 27, 2000 || Socorro || LINEAR || FLO || align=right | 2.0 km || 
|-id=447 bgcolor=#fefefe
| 92447 ||  || — || May 27, 2000 || Socorro || LINEAR || FLO || align=right | 1.5 km || 
|-id=448 bgcolor=#fefefe
| 92448 ||  || — || May 28, 2000 || Socorro || LINEAR || FLO || align=right | 1.2 km || 
|-id=449 bgcolor=#fefefe
| 92449 ||  || — || May 28, 2000 || Socorro || LINEAR || — || align=right | 1.4 km || 
|-id=450 bgcolor=#fefefe
| 92450 ||  || — || May 28, 2000 || Socorro || LINEAR || FLO || align=right | 1.1 km || 
|-id=451 bgcolor=#fefefe
| 92451 ||  || — || May 28, 2000 || Socorro || LINEAR || NYS || align=right | 1.5 km || 
|-id=452 bgcolor=#fefefe
| 92452 ||  || — || May 28, 2000 || Socorro || LINEAR || — || align=right | 1.2 km || 
|-id=453 bgcolor=#fefefe
| 92453 ||  || — || May 28, 2000 || Socorro || LINEAR || — || align=right | 1.5 km || 
|-id=454 bgcolor=#fefefe
| 92454 ||  || — || May 28, 2000 || Socorro || LINEAR || — || align=right | 1.6 km || 
|-id=455 bgcolor=#fefefe
| 92455 ||  || — || May 28, 2000 || Socorro || LINEAR || NYS || align=right | 1.3 km || 
|-id=456 bgcolor=#fefefe
| 92456 ||  || — || May 29, 2000 || Reedy Creek || J. Broughton || FLO || align=right | 2.5 km || 
|-id=457 bgcolor=#fefefe
| 92457 ||  || — || May 27, 2000 || Socorro || LINEAR || FLO || align=right | 1.9 km || 
|-id=458 bgcolor=#fefefe
| 92458 ||  || — || May 27, 2000 || Socorro || LINEAR || — || align=right | 1.4 km || 
|-id=459 bgcolor=#fefefe
| 92459 ||  || — || May 24, 2000 || Kitt Peak || Spacewatch || FLO || align=right | 1.4 km || 
|-id=460 bgcolor=#fefefe
| 92460 ||  || — || May 24, 2000 || Kitt Peak || Spacewatch || FLO || align=right | 1.3 km || 
|-id=461 bgcolor=#fefefe
| 92461 ||  || — || May 26, 2000 || Kitt Peak || Spacewatch || — || align=right | 1.3 km || 
|-id=462 bgcolor=#fefefe
| 92462 ||  || — || May 27, 2000 || Socorro || LINEAR || — || align=right | 1.7 km || 
|-id=463 bgcolor=#fefefe
| 92463 ||  || — || May 27, 2000 || Socorro || LINEAR || — || align=right | 1.7 km || 
|-id=464 bgcolor=#fefefe
| 92464 ||  || — || May 27, 2000 || Socorro || LINEAR || — || align=right | 1.8 km || 
|-id=465 bgcolor=#fefefe
| 92465 ||  || — || May 28, 2000 || Socorro || LINEAR || — || align=right | 4.5 km || 
|-id=466 bgcolor=#fefefe
| 92466 ||  || — || May 24, 2000 || Anderson Mesa || LONEOS || — || align=right | 4.2 km || 
|-id=467 bgcolor=#fefefe
| 92467 ||  || — || May 24, 2000 || Anderson Mesa || LONEOS || — || align=right | 1.6 km || 
|-id=468 bgcolor=#fefefe
| 92468 ||  || — || May 25, 2000 || Anderson Mesa || LONEOS || — || align=right | 1.2 km || 
|-id=469 bgcolor=#fefefe
| 92469 ||  || — || May 26, 2000 || Anderson Mesa || LONEOS || — || align=right | 3.5 km || 
|-id=470 bgcolor=#fefefe
| 92470 ||  || — || May 26, 2000 || Anderson Mesa || LONEOS || V || align=right | 1.5 km || 
|-id=471 bgcolor=#fefefe
| 92471 ||  || — || May 29, 2000 || Kitt Peak || Spacewatch || — || align=right | 1.6 km || 
|-id=472 bgcolor=#fefefe
| 92472 ||  || — || May 28, 2000 || Anderson Mesa || LONEOS || FLO || align=right | 1.1 km || 
|-id=473 bgcolor=#fefefe
| 92473 || 2000 LP || — || June 2, 2000 || Reedy Creek || J. Broughton || — || align=right | 1.6 km || 
|-id=474 bgcolor=#fefefe
| 92474 ||  || — || June 4, 2000 || Socorro || LINEAR || — || align=right | 1.9 km || 
|-id=475 bgcolor=#fefefe
| 92475 ||  || — || June 5, 2000 || Socorro || LINEAR || — || align=right | 1.7 km || 
|-id=476 bgcolor=#fefefe
| 92476 ||  || — || June 5, 2000 || Socorro || LINEAR || — || align=right | 1.7 km || 
|-id=477 bgcolor=#fefefe
| 92477 ||  || — || June 5, 2000 || Socorro || LINEAR || — || align=right | 2.0 km || 
|-id=478 bgcolor=#fefefe
| 92478 ||  || — || June 6, 2000 || Socorro || LINEAR || FLO || align=right | 2.6 km || 
|-id=479 bgcolor=#fefefe
| 92479 ||  || — || June 5, 2000 || Socorro || LINEAR || — || align=right | 1.7 km || 
|-id=480 bgcolor=#fefefe
| 92480 ||  || — || June 5, 2000 || Socorro || LINEAR || FLO || align=right | 1.7 km || 
|-id=481 bgcolor=#fefefe
| 92481 ||  || — || June 4, 2000 || Socorro || LINEAR || — || align=right | 2.4 km || 
|-id=482 bgcolor=#fefefe
| 92482 ||  || — || June 6, 2000 || Socorro || LINEAR || V || align=right | 1.3 km || 
|-id=483 bgcolor=#fefefe
| 92483 ||  || — || June 8, 2000 || Socorro || LINEAR || — || align=right | 3.4 km || 
|-id=484 bgcolor=#fefefe
| 92484 ||  || — || June 8, 2000 || Socorro || LINEAR || — || align=right | 1.8 km || 
|-id=485 bgcolor=#fefefe
| 92485 ||  || — || June 10, 2000 || Kitt Peak || Spacewatch || V || align=right | 1.3 km || 
|-id=486 bgcolor=#E9E9E9
| 92486 ||  || — || June 9, 2000 || Haleakala || NEAT || — || align=right | 3.7 km || 
|-id=487 bgcolor=#fefefe
| 92487 ||  || — || June 5, 2000 || Anderson Mesa || LONEOS || — || align=right | 1.7 km || 
|-id=488 bgcolor=#fefefe
| 92488 ||  || — || June 1, 2000 || Haleakala || NEAT || FLO || align=right | 1.7 km || 
|-id=489 bgcolor=#fefefe
| 92489 || 2000 MK || — || June 24, 2000 || Tebbutt || F. B. Zoltowski || V || align=right | 1.6 km || 
|-id=490 bgcolor=#fefefe
| 92490 ||  || — || June 29, 2000 || Reedy Creek || J. Broughton || MAS || align=right | 1.9 km || 
|-id=491 bgcolor=#fefefe
| 92491 ||  || — || June 29, 2000 || Reedy Creek || J. Broughton || ERI || align=right | 3.5 km || 
|-id=492 bgcolor=#fefefe
| 92492 ||  || — || June 24, 2000 || Socorro || LINEAR || KLI || align=right | 4.4 km || 
|-id=493 bgcolor=#fefefe
| 92493 ||  || — || June 25, 2000 || Socorro || LINEAR || NYS || align=right | 2.9 km || 
|-id=494 bgcolor=#fefefe
| 92494 ||  || — || June 24, 2000 || Socorro || LINEAR || PHO || align=right | 2.2 km || 
|-id=495 bgcolor=#fefefe
| 92495 || 2000 NY || — || July 4, 2000 || Prescott || P. G. Comba || — || align=right | 1.7 km || 
|-id=496 bgcolor=#fefefe
| 92496 ||  || — || July 5, 2000 || Reedy Creek || J. Broughton || — || align=right | 1.6 km || 
|-id=497 bgcolor=#fefefe
| 92497 ||  || — || July 3, 2000 || Socorro || LINEAR || ERI || align=right | 3.6 km || 
|-id=498 bgcolor=#fefefe
| 92498 ||  || — || July 7, 2000 || Socorro || LINEAR || — || align=right | 2.4 km || 
|-id=499 bgcolor=#fefefe
| 92499 ||  || — || July 5, 2000 || Anderson Mesa || LONEOS || V || align=right | 1.8 km || 
|-id=500 bgcolor=#fefefe
| 92500 ||  || — || July 5, 2000 || Anderson Mesa || LONEOS || V || align=right | 1.8 km || 
|}

92501–92600 

|-bgcolor=#fefefe
| 92501 ||  || — || July 5, 2000 || Anderson Mesa || LONEOS || — || align=right | 2.1 km || 
|-id=502 bgcolor=#fefefe
| 92502 ||  || — || July 5, 2000 || Anderson Mesa || LONEOS || V || align=right | 2.0 km || 
|-id=503 bgcolor=#fefefe
| 92503 ||  || — || July 5, 2000 || Anderson Mesa || LONEOS || V || align=right | 1.8 km || 
|-id=504 bgcolor=#fefefe
| 92504 ||  || — || July 5, 2000 || Anderson Mesa || LONEOS || NYS || align=right | 1.6 km || 
|-id=505 bgcolor=#fefefe
| 92505 ||  || — || July 5, 2000 || Anderson Mesa || LONEOS || NYS || align=right | 1.2 km || 
|-id=506 bgcolor=#fefefe
| 92506 ||  || — || July 5, 2000 || Anderson Mesa || LONEOS || — || align=right | 4.8 km || 
|-id=507 bgcolor=#fefefe
| 92507 ||  || — || July 5, 2000 || Anderson Mesa || LONEOS || V || align=right | 1.7 km || 
|-id=508 bgcolor=#fefefe
| 92508 ||  || — || July 5, 2000 || Anderson Mesa || LONEOS || — || align=right | 2.7 km || 
|-id=509 bgcolor=#fefefe
| 92509 ||  || — || July 5, 2000 || Anderson Mesa || LONEOS || — || align=right | 2.0 km || 
|-id=510 bgcolor=#fefefe
| 92510 ||  || — || July 5, 2000 || Anderson Mesa || LONEOS || — || align=right | 1.6 km || 
|-id=511 bgcolor=#fefefe
| 92511 ||  || — || July 6, 2000 || Kitt Peak || Spacewatch || — || align=right | 1.8 km || 
|-id=512 bgcolor=#fefefe
| 92512 ||  || — || July 6, 2000 || Kitt Peak || Spacewatch || NYS || align=right | 1.2 km || 
|-id=513 bgcolor=#fefefe
| 92513 ||  || — || July 6, 2000 || Anderson Mesa || LONEOS || — || align=right | 1.8 km || 
|-id=514 bgcolor=#fefefe
| 92514 ||  || — || July 6, 2000 || Anderson Mesa || LONEOS || — || align=right | 2.8 km || 
|-id=515 bgcolor=#fefefe
| 92515 ||  || — || July 7, 2000 || Socorro || LINEAR || FLO || align=right | 1.4 km || 
|-id=516 bgcolor=#fefefe
| 92516 ||  || — || July 4, 2000 || Anderson Mesa || LONEOS || — || align=right | 3.2 km || 
|-id=517 bgcolor=#fefefe
| 92517 ||  || — || July 4, 2000 || Anderson Mesa || LONEOS || — || align=right | 2.1 km || 
|-id=518 bgcolor=#fefefe
| 92518 ||  || — || July 4, 2000 || Anderson Mesa || LONEOS || NYS || align=right | 1.4 km || 
|-id=519 bgcolor=#fefefe
| 92519 ||  || — || July 4, 2000 || Anderson Mesa || LONEOS || — || align=right | 2.7 km || 
|-id=520 bgcolor=#fefefe
| 92520 ||  || — || July 3, 2000 || Socorro || LINEAR || — || align=right | 2.6 km || 
|-id=521 bgcolor=#fefefe
| 92521 ||  || — || July 3, 2000 || Socorro || LINEAR || — || align=right | 1.7 km || 
|-id=522 bgcolor=#fefefe
| 92522 ||  || — || July 2, 2000 || Kitt Peak || Spacewatch || — || align=right | 2.5 km || 
|-id=523 bgcolor=#fefefe
| 92523 ||  || — || July 4, 2000 || Anderson Mesa || LONEOS || NYS || align=right | 1.3 km || 
|-id=524 bgcolor=#fefefe
| 92524 ||  || — || July 25, 2000 || Kitt Peak || Spacewatch || — || align=right | 1.6 km || 
|-id=525 bgcolor=#fefefe
| 92525 Delucchi ||  ||  || July 28, 2000 || Gnosca || S. Sposetti || NYS || align=right | 1.4 km || 
|-id=526 bgcolor=#fefefe
| 92526 ||  || — || July 23, 2000 || Socorro || LINEAR || — || align=right | 4.6 km || 
|-id=527 bgcolor=#fefefe
| 92527 ||  || — || July 30, 2000 || Lake Tekapo || Mount John Obs. || FLO || align=right | 1.3 km || 
|-id=528 bgcolor=#fefefe
| 92528 ||  || — || July 23, 2000 || Socorro || LINEAR || LCI || align=right | 2.1 km || 
|-id=529 bgcolor=#fefefe
| 92529 ||  || — || July 23, 2000 || Socorro || LINEAR || — || align=right | 4.0 km || 
|-id=530 bgcolor=#fefefe
| 92530 ||  || — || July 23, 2000 || Socorro || LINEAR || NYS || align=right | 1.1 km || 
|-id=531 bgcolor=#fefefe
| 92531 ||  || — || July 23, 2000 || Socorro || LINEAR || V || align=right | 1.4 km || 
|-id=532 bgcolor=#fefefe
| 92532 ||  || — || July 23, 2000 || Socorro || LINEAR || — || align=right | 1.7 km || 
|-id=533 bgcolor=#fefefe
| 92533 ||  || — || July 23, 2000 || Socorro || LINEAR || — || align=right | 1.5 km || 
|-id=534 bgcolor=#fefefe
| 92534 ||  || — || July 23, 2000 || Socorro || LINEAR || NYS || align=right | 1.6 km || 
|-id=535 bgcolor=#fefefe
| 92535 ||  || — || July 23, 2000 || Socorro || LINEAR || NYS || align=right | 1.5 km || 
|-id=536 bgcolor=#fefefe
| 92536 ||  || — || July 23, 2000 || Socorro || LINEAR || NYS || align=right | 1.9 km || 
|-id=537 bgcolor=#fefefe
| 92537 ||  || — || July 23, 2000 || Socorro || LINEAR || — || align=right | 2.3 km || 
|-id=538 bgcolor=#fefefe
| 92538 ||  || — || July 23, 2000 || Socorro || LINEAR || NYS || align=right | 1.7 km || 
|-id=539 bgcolor=#fefefe
| 92539 ||  || — || July 23, 2000 || Socorro || LINEAR || FLO || align=right | 3.0 km || 
|-id=540 bgcolor=#fefefe
| 92540 ||  || — || July 30, 2000 || Socorro || LINEAR || V || align=right | 1.8 km || 
|-id=541 bgcolor=#E9E9E9
| 92541 ||  || — || July 31, 2000 || Socorro || LINEAR || HNS || align=right | 3.6 km || 
|-id=542 bgcolor=#fefefe
| 92542 ||  || — || July 31, 2000 || Bergisch Gladbach || W. Bickel || — || align=right | 2.1 km || 
|-id=543 bgcolor=#fefefe
| 92543 ||  || — || July 23, 2000 || Socorro || LINEAR || — || align=right | 1.7 km || 
|-id=544 bgcolor=#fefefe
| 92544 ||  || — || July 23, 2000 || Socorro || LINEAR || — || align=right | 2.3 km || 
|-id=545 bgcolor=#fefefe
| 92545 ||  || — || July 30, 2000 || Socorro || LINEAR || V || align=right | 1.3 km || 
|-id=546 bgcolor=#fefefe
| 92546 ||  || — || July 30, 2000 || Socorro || LINEAR || — || align=right | 3.0 km || 
|-id=547 bgcolor=#fefefe
| 92547 ||  || — || July 30, 2000 || Socorro || LINEAR || V || align=right | 1.4 km || 
|-id=548 bgcolor=#fefefe
| 92548 ||  || — || July 30, 2000 || Socorro || LINEAR || — || align=right | 1.9 km || 
|-id=549 bgcolor=#fefefe
| 92549 ||  || — || July 30, 2000 || Socorro || LINEAR || — || align=right | 1.8 km || 
|-id=550 bgcolor=#fefefe
| 92550 ||  || — || July 30, 2000 || Socorro || LINEAR || — || align=right | 1.7 km || 
|-id=551 bgcolor=#fefefe
| 92551 ||  || — || July 30, 2000 || Socorro || LINEAR || — || align=right | 2.2 km || 
|-id=552 bgcolor=#fefefe
| 92552 ||  || — || July 30, 2000 || Socorro || LINEAR || KLI || align=right | 4.4 km || 
|-id=553 bgcolor=#fefefe
| 92553 ||  || — || July 30, 2000 || Socorro || LINEAR || — || align=right | 2.2 km || 
|-id=554 bgcolor=#fefefe
| 92554 ||  || — || July 30, 2000 || Socorro || LINEAR || — || align=right | 2.2 km || 
|-id=555 bgcolor=#E9E9E9
| 92555 ||  || — || July 30, 2000 || Socorro || LINEAR || MIT || align=right | 5.6 km || 
|-id=556 bgcolor=#fefefe
| 92556 ||  || — || July 30, 2000 || Socorro || LINEAR || — || align=right | 2.5 km || 
|-id=557 bgcolor=#fefefe
| 92557 ||  || — || July 30, 2000 || Socorro || LINEAR || V || align=right | 1.5 km || 
|-id=558 bgcolor=#E9E9E9
| 92558 ||  || — || July 30, 2000 || Socorro || LINEAR || — || align=right | 1.8 km || 
|-id=559 bgcolor=#fefefe
| 92559 ||  || — || July 30, 2000 || Socorro || LINEAR || — || align=right | 2.4 km || 
|-id=560 bgcolor=#fefefe
| 92560 ||  || — || July 30, 2000 || Socorro || LINEAR || KLI || align=right | 4.4 km || 
|-id=561 bgcolor=#fefefe
| 92561 ||  || — || July 31, 2000 || Socorro || LINEAR || V || align=right | 2.2 km || 
|-id=562 bgcolor=#fefefe
| 92562 ||  || — || July 31, 2000 || Socorro || LINEAR || — || align=right | 4.1 km || 
|-id=563 bgcolor=#fefefe
| 92563 ||  || — || July 30, 2000 || Reedy Creek || J. Broughton || MAS || align=right | 1.4 km || 
|-id=564 bgcolor=#E9E9E9
| 92564 ||  || — || July 30, 2000 || Socorro || LINEAR || — || align=right | 3.7 km || 
|-id=565 bgcolor=#fefefe
| 92565 ||  || — || July 30, 2000 || Socorro || LINEAR || V || align=right | 2.5 km || 
|-id=566 bgcolor=#fefefe
| 92566 ||  || — || July 30, 2000 || Socorro || LINEAR || V || align=right | 2.9 km || 
|-id=567 bgcolor=#fefefe
| 92567 ||  || — || July 29, 2000 || Anderson Mesa || LONEOS || MAS || align=right | 1.8 km || 
|-id=568 bgcolor=#E9E9E9
| 92568 ||  || — || July 29, 2000 || Anderson Mesa || LONEOS || — || align=right | 2.1 km || 
|-id=569 bgcolor=#fefefe
| 92569 ||  || — || July 29, 2000 || Anderson Mesa || LONEOS || MAS || align=right | 1.5 km || 
|-id=570 bgcolor=#fefefe
| 92570 ||  || — || July 29, 2000 || Anderson Mesa || LONEOS || — || align=right | 1.6 km || 
|-id=571 bgcolor=#fefefe
| 92571 ||  || — || July 29, 2000 || Anderson Mesa || LONEOS || — || align=right | 1.9 km || 
|-id=572 bgcolor=#fefefe
| 92572 ||  || — || July 29, 2000 || Anderson Mesa || LONEOS || EUT || align=right | 1.4 km || 
|-id=573 bgcolor=#fefefe
| 92573 ||  || — || July 29, 2000 || Anderson Mesa || LONEOS || NYS || align=right | 1.5 km || 
|-id=574 bgcolor=#fefefe
| 92574 ||  || — || July 29, 2000 || Anderson Mesa || LONEOS || — || align=right | 1.6 km || 
|-id=575 bgcolor=#fefefe
| 92575 ||  || — || July 29, 2000 || Anderson Mesa || LONEOS || — || align=right | 2.1 km || 
|-id=576 bgcolor=#fefefe
| 92576 ||  || — || July 29, 2000 || Anderson Mesa || LONEOS || NYS || align=right | 1.5 km || 
|-id=577 bgcolor=#fefefe
| 92577 ||  || — || July 29, 2000 || Anderson Mesa || LONEOS || V || align=right | 1.4 km || 
|-id=578 bgcolor=#fefefe
| 92578 Benecchi ||  ||  || July 30, 2000 || Cerro Tololo || S. D. Kern || — || align=right | 1.5 km || 
|-id=579 bgcolor=#fefefe
| 92579 Dwight ||  ||  || July 31, 2000 || Cerro Tololo || M. W. Buie || — || align=right | 1.4 km || 
|-id=580 bgcolor=#fefefe
| 92580 || 2000 PZ || — || August 1, 2000 || Socorro || LINEAR || FLO || align=right | 1.2 km || 
|-id=581 bgcolor=#fefefe
| 92581 ||  || — || August 1, 2000 || Socorro || LINEAR || — || align=right | 2.2 km || 
|-id=582 bgcolor=#fefefe
| 92582 ||  || — || August 1, 2000 || Socorro || LINEAR || V || align=right | 1.6 km || 
|-id=583 bgcolor=#fefefe
| 92583 ||  || — || August 1, 2000 || Socorro || LINEAR || NYS || align=right | 1.6 km || 
|-id=584 bgcolor=#fefefe
| 92584 ||  || — || August 2, 2000 || Socorro || LINEAR || — || align=right | 5.1 km || 
|-id=585 bgcolor=#fefefe
| 92585 Fumagalli ||  ||  || August 7, 2000 || Gnosca || S. Sposetti || NYS || align=right | 1.4 km || 
|-id=586 bgcolor=#fefefe
| 92586 Jaxonpowell ||  ||  || August 9, 2000 || Emerald Lane || L. Ball || V || align=right | 1.6 km || 
|-id=587 bgcolor=#E9E9E9
| 92587 ||  || — || August 6, 2000 || Siding Spring || R. H. McNaught || MIT || align=right | 4.5 km || 
|-id=588 bgcolor=#fefefe
| 92588 ||  || — || August 1, 2000 || Socorro || LINEAR || — || align=right | 3.1 km || 
|-id=589 bgcolor=#fefefe
| 92589 ||  || — || August 3, 2000 || Socorro || LINEAR || — || align=right | 2.9 km || 
|-id=590 bgcolor=#fefefe
| 92590 ||  || — || August 1, 2000 || Socorro || LINEAR || FLO || align=right | 1.9 km || 
|-id=591 bgcolor=#fefefe
| 92591 ||  || — || August 1, 2000 || Socorro || LINEAR || — || align=right | 2.7 km || 
|-id=592 bgcolor=#fefefe
| 92592 ||  || — || August 1, 2000 || Socorro || LINEAR || V || align=right | 1.5 km || 
|-id=593 bgcolor=#fefefe
| 92593 ||  || — || August 1, 2000 || Socorro || LINEAR || — || align=right | 2.3 km || 
|-id=594 bgcolor=#E9E9E9
| 92594 ||  || — || August 1, 2000 || Socorro || LINEAR || — || align=right | 1.8 km || 
|-id=595 bgcolor=#fefefe
| 92595 ||  || — || August 1, 2000 || Socorro || LINEAR || V || align=right | 1.2 km || 
|-id=596 bgcolor=#fefefe
| 92596 ||  || — || August 1, 2000 || Socorro || LINEAR || NYS || align=right | 1.5 km || 
|-id=597 bgcolor=#fefefe
| 92597 ||  || — || August 1, 2000 || Socorro || LINEAR || FLO || align=right | 2.6 km || 
|-id=598 bgcolor=#fefefe
| 92598 ||  || — || August 1, 2000 || Socorro || LINEAR || FLO || align=right | 1.3 km || 
|-id=599 bgcolor=#fefefe
| 92599 ||  || — || August 1, 2000 || Socorro || LINEAR || — || align=right | 2.7 km || 
|-id=600 bgcolor=#fefefe
| 92600 ||  || — || August 1, 2000 || Socorro || LINEAR || V || align=right | 1.7 km || 
|}

92601–92700 

|-bgcolor=#fefefe
| 92601 ||  || — || August 1, 2000 || Socorro || LINEAR || NYS || align=right | 1.2 km || 
|-id=602 bgcolor=#E9E9E9
| 92602 ||  || — || August 1, 2000 || Socorro || LINEAR || — || align=right | 2.5 km || 
|-id=603 bgcolor=#fefefe
| 92603 ||  || — || August 1, 2000 || Socorro || LINEAR || MAS || align=right | 1.5 km || 
|-id=604 bgcolor=#fefefe
| 92604 ||  || — || August 1, 2000 || Socorro || LINEAR || — || align=right | 1.8 km || 
|-id=605 bgcolor=#fefefe
| 92605 ||  || — || August 2, 2000 || Socorro || LINEAR || — || align=right | 1.9 km || 
|-id=606 bgcolor=#E9E9E9
| 92606 ||  || — || August 2, 2000 || Socorro || LINEAR || — || align=right | 2.5 km || 
|-id=607 bgcolor=#fefefe
| 92607 ||  || — || August 2, 2000 || Socorro || LINEAR || — || align=right | 1.7 km || 
|-id=608 bgcolor=#fefefe
| 92608 ||  || — || August 2, 2000 || Socorro || LINEAR || — || align=right | 2.7 km || 
|-id=609 bgcolor=#E9E9E9
| 92609 ||  || — || August 2, 2000 || Socorro || LINEAR || — || align=right | 2.4 km || 
|-id=610 bgcolor=#E9E9E9
| 92610 ||  || — || August 2, 2000 || Kitt Peak || Spacewatch || — || align=right | 2.2 km || 
|-id=611 bgcolor=#E9E9E9
| 92611 ||  || — || August 5, 2000 || Haleakala || NEAT || EUN || align=right | 2.9 km || 
|-id=612 bgcolor=#E9E9E9
| 92612 ||  || — || August 9, 2000 || Socorro || LINEAR || — || align=right | 5.3 km || 
|-id=613 bgcolor=#E9E9E9
| 92613 || 2000 QO || — || August 21, 2000 || Prescott || P. G. Comba || — || align=right | 2.0 km || 
|-id=614 bgcolor=#fefefe
| 92614 Kazutami || 2000 QY ||  || August 23, 2000 || Gnosca || S. Sposetti || NYS || align=right | 4.8 km || 
|-id=615 bgcolor=#fefefe
| 92615 ||  || — || August 23, 2000 || Gnosca || S. Sposetti || — || align=right | 1.4 km || 
|-id=616 bgcolor=#fefefe
| 92616 ||  || — || August 24, 2000 || Gnosca || S. Sposetti || — || align=right | 3.3 km || 
|-id=617 bgcolor=#fefefe
| 92617 ||  || — || August 24, 2000 || Socorro || LINEAR || NYS || align=right | 1.7 km || 
|-id=618 bgcolor=#fefefe
| 92618 ||  || — || August 24, 2000 || Socorro || LINEAR || — || align=right | 3.8 km || 
|-id=619 bgcolor=#E9E9E9
| 92619 ||  || — || August 24, 2000 || Socorro || LINEAR || — || align=right | 1.5 km || 
|-id=620 bgcolor=#fefefe
| 92620 ||  || — || August 24, 2000 || Socorro || LINEAR || — || align=right | 5.3 km || 
|-id=621 bgcolor=#E9E9E9
| 92621 ||  || — || August 24, 2000 || Socorro || LINEAR || — || align=right | 1.8 km || 
|-id=622 bgcolor=#fefefe
| 92622 ||  || — || August 24, 2000 || Socorro || LINEAR || — || align=right | 3.0 km || 
|-id=623 bgcolor=#fefefe
| 92623 ||  || — || August 25, 2000 || Višnjan Observatory || K. Korlević, M. Jurić || V || align=right | 1.9 km || 
|-id=624 bgcolor=#fefefe
| 92624 ||  || — || August 24, 2000 || Socorro || LINEAR || MAS || align=right | 1.6 km || 
|-id=625 bgcolor=#fefefe
| 92625 ||  || — || August 24, 2000 || Socorro || LINEAR || NYS || align=right | 1.2 km || 
|-id=626 bgcolor=#fefefe
| 92626 ||  || — || August 24, 2000 || Socorro || LINEAR || — || align=right | 1.5 km || 
|-id=627 bgcolor=#fefefe
| 92627 ||  || — || August 24, 2000 || Socorro || LINEAR || — || align=right | 2.1 km || 
|-id=628 bgcolor=#fefefe
| 92628 ||  || — || August 24, 2000 || Socorro || LINEAR || MAS || align=right | 1.4 km || 
|-id=629 bgcolor=#fefefe
| 92629 ||  || — || August 24, 2000 || Socorro || LINEAR || NYS || align=right | 1.5 km || 
|-id=630 bgcolor=#fefefe
| 92630 ||  || — || August 24, 2000 || Socorro || LINEAR || — || align=right | 1.8 km || 
|-id=631 bgcolor=#fefefe
| 92631 ||  || — || August 24, 2000 || Socorro || LINEAR || V || align=right | 1.5 km || 
|-id=632 bgcolor=#fefefe
| 92632 ||  || — || August 24, 2000 || Socorro || LINEAR || NYS || align=right | 1.1 km || 
|-id=633 bgcolor=#fefefe
| 92633 ||  || — || August 24, 2000 || Socorro || LINEAR || NYS || align=right | 1.3 km || 
|-id=634 bgcolor=#fefefe
| 92634 ||  || — || August 24, 2000 || Socorro || LINEAR || CLA || align=right | 3.0 km || 
|-id=635 bgcolor=#fefefe
| 92635 ||  || — || August 24, 2000 || Socorro || LINEAR || V || align=right | 2.0 km || 
|-id=636 bgcolor=#E9E9E9
| 92636 ||  || — || August 24, 2000 || Socorro || LINEAR || — || align=right | 3.8 km || 
|-id=637 bgcolor=#fefefe
| 92637 ||  || — || August 24, 2000 || Socorro || LINEAR || — || align=right | 2.2 km || 
|-id=638 bgcolor=#fefefe
| 92638 ||  || — || August 24, 2000 || Socorro || LINEAR || — || align=right | 1.3 km || 
|-id=639 bgcolor=#E9E9E9
| 92639 ||  || — || August 24, 2000 || Socorro || LINEAR || — || align=right | 2.1 km || 
|-id=640 bgcolor=#fefefe
| 92640 ||  || — || August 25, 2000 || Socorro || LINEAR || — || align=right | 2.3 km || 
|-id=641 bgcolor=#fefefe
| 92641 ||  || — || August 25, 2000 || Socorro || LINEAR || — || align=right | 2.0 km || 
|-id=642 bgcolor=#fefefe
| 92642 ||  || — || August 25, 2000 || Socorro || LINEAR || V || align=right | 1.7 km || 
|-id=643 bgcolor=#fefefe
| 92643 ||  || — || August 25, 2000 || Socorro || LINEAR || — || align=right | 2.1 km || 
|-id=644 bgcolor=#fefefe
| 92644 ||  || — || August 24, 2000 || Socorro || LINEAR || — || align=right | 1.7 km || 
|-id=645 bgcolor=#fefefe
| 92645 ||  || — || August 24, 2000 || Socorro || LINEAR || NYS || align=right | 1.4 km || 
|-id=646 bgcolor=#fefefe
| 92646 ||  || — || August 26, 2000 || Socorro || LINEAR || V || align=right | 1.6 km || 
|-id=647 bgcolor=#fefefe
| 92647 ||  || — || August 26, 2000 || Socorro || LINEAR || — || align=right | 4.7 km || 
|-id=648 bgcolor=#fefefe
| 92648 ||  || — || August 28, 2000 || Reedy Creek || J. Broughton || — || align=right | 3.0 km || 
|-id=649 bgcolor=#fefefe
| 92649 ||  || — || August 24, 2000 || Socorro || LINEAR || FLO || align=right | 1.4 km || 
|-id=650 bgcolor=#fefefe
| 92650 ||  || — || August 24, 2000 || Socorro || LINEAR || NYS || align=right | 1.3 km || 
|-id=651 bgcolor=#fefefe
| 92651 ||  || — || August 24, 2000 || Socorro || LINEAR || — || align=right | 1.8 km || 
|-id=652 bgcolor=#fefefe
| 92652 ||  || — || August 24, 2000 || Socorro || LINEAR || — || align=right | 2.4 km || 
|-id=653 bgcolor=#fefefe
| 92653 ||  || — || August 24, 2000 || Socorro || LINEAR || MAS || align=right | 1.6 km || 
|-id=654 bgcolor=#fefefe
| 92654 ||  || — || August 24, 2000 || Socorro || LINEAR || NYS || align=right | 1.6 km || 
|-id=655 bgcolor=#fefefe
| 92655 ||  || — || August 24, 2000 || Socorro || LINEAR || NYS || align=right | 1.4 km || 
|-id=656 bgcolor=#fefefe
| 92656 ||  || — || August 24, 2000 || Socorro || LINEAR || V || align=right | 1.4 km || 
|-id=657 bgcolor=#fefefe
| 92657 ||  || — || August 24, 2000 || Socorro || LINEAR || V || align=right | 2.7 km || 
|-id=658 bgcolor=#fefefe
| 92658 ||  || — || August 24, 2000 || Socorro || LINEAR || V || align=right | 1.4 km || 
|-id=659 bgcolor=#fefefe
| 92659 ||  || — || August 24, 2000 || Socorro || LINEAR || — || align=right | 1.5 km || 
|-id=660 bgcolor=#fefefe
| 92660 ||  || — || August 24, 2000 || Socorro || LINEAR || NYS || align=right | 1.7 km || 
|-id=661 bgcolor=#E9E9E9
| 92661 ||  || — || August 24, 2000 || Socorro || LINEAR || — || align=right | 1.9 km || 
|-id=662 bgcolor=#E9E9E9
| 92662 ||  || — || August 24, 2000 || Socorro || LINEAR || EUN || align=right | 2.2 km || 
|-id=663 bgcolor=#fefefe
| 92663 ||  || — || August 24, 2000 || Socorro || LINEAR || — || align=right | 1.8 km || 
|-id=664 bgcolor=#E9E9E9
| 92664 ||  || — || August 24, 2000 || Socorro || LINEAR || — || align=right | 1.4 km || 
|-id=665 bgcolor=#fefefe
| 92665 ||  || — || August 24, 2000 || Socorro || LINEAR || — || align=right | 1.9 km || 
|-id=666 bgcolor=#fefefe
| 92666 ||  || — || August 24, 2000 || Socorro || LINEAR || — || align=right | 1.9 km || 
|-id=667 bgcolor=#fefefe
| 92667 ||  || — || August 24, 2000 || Socorro || LINEAR || V || align=right | 1.5 km || 
|-id=668 bgcolor=#fefefe
| 92668 ||  || — || August 24, 2000 || Socorro || LINEAR || fast? || align=right | 1.5 km || 
|-id=669 bgcolor=#fefefe
| 92669 ||  || — || August 25, 2000 || Socorro || LINEAR || — || align=right | 1.6 km || 
|-id=670 bgcolor=#fefefe
| 92670 ||  || — || August 25, 2000 || Socorro || LINEAR || — || align=right | 1.5 km || 
|-id=671 bgcolor=#fefefe
| 92671 ||  || — || August 25, 2000 || Socorro || LINEAR || — || align=right | 2.5 km || 
|-id=672 bgcolor=#fefefe
| 92672 ||  || — || August 26, 2000 || Socorro || LINEAR || V || align=right | 1.3 km || 
|-id=673 bgcolor=#fefefe
| 92673 ||  || — || August 26, 2000 || Socorro || LINEAR || — || align=right | 1.6 km || 
|-id=674 bgcolor=#E9E9E9
| 92674 ||  || — || August 26, 2000 || Socorro || LINEAR || — || align=right | 1.3 km || 
|-id=675 bgcolor=#fefefe
| 92675 ||  || — || August 28, 2000 || Socorro || LINEAR || NYS || align=right | 1.5 km || 
|-id=676 bgcolor=#fefefe
| 92676 ||  || — || August 28, 2000 || Socorro || LINEAR || — || align=right | 2.6 km || 
|-id=677 bgcolor=#fefefe
| 92677 ||  || — || August 28, 2000 || Socorro || LINEAR || — || align=right | 2.2 km || 
|-id=678 bgcolor=#fefefe
| 92678 ||  || — || August 28, 2000 || Socorro || LINEAR || — || align=right | 2.3 km || 
|-id=679 bgcolor=#E9E9E9
| 92679 ||  || — || August 28, 2000 || Socorro || LINEAR || — || align=right | 1.6 km || 
|-id=680 bgcolor=#fefefe
| 92680 ||  || — || August 28, 2000 || Socorro || LINEAR || — || align=right | 1.9 km || 
|-id=681 bgcolor=#E9E9E9
| 92681 ||  || — || August 28, 2000 || Socorro || LINEAR || MAR || align=right | 2.5 km || 
|-id=682 bgcolor=#fefefe
| 92682 ||  || — || August 28, 2000 || Socorro || LINEAR || — || align=right | 3.5 km || 
|-id=683 bgcolor=#E9E9E9
| 92683 ||  || — || August 28, 2000 || Socorro || LINEAR || — || align=right | 2.1 km || 
|-id=684 bgcolor=#fefefe
| 92684 ||  || — || August 26, 2000 || Kitt Peak || Spacewatch || — || align=right | 3.2 km || 
|-id=685 bgcolor=#fefefe
| 92685 Cordellorenz ||  ||  || August 31, 2000 || Cordell-Lorenz || D. T. Durig || — || align=right | 2.1 km || 
|-id=686 bgcolor=#fefefe
| 92686 ||  || — || August 24, 2000 || Socorro || LINEAR || V || align=right | 1.5 km || 
|-id=687 bgcolor=#fefefe
| 92687 ||  || — || August 24, 2000 || Socorro || LINEAR || NYS || align=right | 1.3 km || 
|-id=688 bgcolor=#E9E9E9
| 92688 ||  || — || August 24, 2000 || Socorro || LINEAR || EUN || align=right | 4.7 km || 
|-id=689 bgcolor=#fefefe
| 92689 ||  || — || August 24, 2000 || Socorro || LINEAR || — || align=right | 1.6 km || 
|-id=690 bgcolor=#fefefe
| 92690 ||  || — || August 24, 2000 || Socorro || LINEAR || — || align=right | 4.4 km || 
|-id=691 bgcolor=#fefefe
| 92691 ||  || — || August 24, 2000 || Socorro || LINEAR || NYS || align=right | 1.2 km || 
|-id=692 bgcolor=#fefefe
| 92692 ||  || — || August 24, 2000 || Socorro || LINEAR || MAS || align=right | 1.4 km || 
|-id=693 bgcolor=#fefefe
| 92693 ||  || — || August 24, 2000 || Socorro || LINEAR || NYS || align=right | 1.2 km || 
|-id=694 bgcolor=#fefefe
| 92694 ||  || — || August 24, 2000 || Socorro || LINEAR || NYS || align=right | 1.7 km || 
|-id=695 bgcolor=#E9E9E9
| 92695 ||  || — || August 24, 2000 || Socorro || LINEAR || EUN || align=right | 3.5 km || 
|-id=696 bgcolor=#fefefe
| 92696 ||  || — || August 24, 2000 || Socorro || LINEAR || — || align=right | 2.1 km || 
|-id=697 bgcolor=#fefefe
| 92697 ||  || — || August 24, 2000 || Socorro || LINEAR || NYS || align=right | 1.1 km || 
|-id=698 bgcolor=#fefefe
| 92698 ||  || — || August 24, 2000 || Socorro || LINEAR || — || align=right | 2.5 km || 
|-id=699 bgcolor=#fefefe
| 92699 ||  || — || August 24, 2000 || Socorro || LINEAR || V || align=right | 2.3 km || 
|-id=700 bgcolor=#fefefe
| 92700 ||  || — || August 24, 2000 || Socorro || LINEAR || — || align=right | 1.9 km || 
|}

92701–92800 

|-bgcolor=#E9E9E9
| 92701 ||  || — || August 24, 2000 || Socorro || LINEAR || — || align=right | 1.8 km || 
|-id=702 bgcolor=#E9E9E9
| 92702 ||  || — || August 24, 2000 || Socorro || LINEAR || — || align=right | 2.0 km || 
|-id=703 bgcolor=#fefefe
| 92703 ||  || — || August 24, 2000 || Socorro || LINEAR || — || align=right | 4.5 km || 
|-id=704 bgcolor=#E9E9E9
| 92704 ||  || — || August 24, 2000 || Socorro || LINEAR || — || align=right | 2.7 km || 
|-id=705 bgcolor=#E9E9E9
| 92705 ||  || — || August 24, 2000 || Socorro || LINEAR || — || align=right | 2.6 km || 
|-id=706 bgcolor=#E9E9E9
| 92706 ||  || — || August 25, 2000 || Socorro || LINEAR || ADE || align=right | 5.2 km || 
|-id=707 bgcolor=#fefefe
| 92707 ||  || — || August 25, 2000 || Socorro || LINEAR || — || align=right | 2.2 km || 
|-id=708 bgcolor=#E9E9E9
| 92708 ||  || — || August 25, 2000 || Socorro || LINEAR || — || align=right | 2.2 km || 
|-id=709 bgcolor=#fefefe
| 92709 ||  || — || August 25, 2000 || Socorro || LINEAR || — || align=right | 1.6 km || 
|-id=710 bgcolor=#fefefe
| 92710 ||  || — || August 25, 2000 || Socorro || LINEAR || — || align=right | 2.7 km || 
|-id=711 bgcolor=#fefefe
| 92711 ||  || — || August 25, 2000 || Socorro || LINEAR || — || align=right | 2.1 km || 
|-id=712 bgcolor=#E9E9E9
| 92712 ||  || — || August 25, 2000 || Socorro || LINEAR || MAR || align=right | 1.8 km || 
|-id=713 bgcolor=#E9E9E9
| 92713 ||  || — || August 25, 2000 || Socorro || LINEAR || — || align=right | 2.0 km || 
|-id=714 bgcolor=#fefefe
| 92714 ||  || — || August 25, 2000 || Socorro || LINEAR || FLO || align=right | 2.6 km || 
|-id=715 bgcolor=#E9E9E9
| 92715 ||  || — || August 25, 2000 || Socorro || LINEAR || — || align=right | 1.8 km || 
|-id=716 bgcolor=#E9E9E9
| 92716 ||  || — || August 25, 2000 || Socorro || LINEAR || — || align=right | 3.9 km || 
|-id=717 bgcolor=#fefefe
| 92717 ||  || — || August 25, 2000 || Socorro || LINEAR || — || align=right | 1.8 km || 
|-id=718 bgcolor=#E9E9E9
| 92718 ||  || — || August 25, 2000 || Socorro || LINEAR || — || align=right | 1.7 km || 
|-id=719 bgcolor=#fefefe
| 92719 ||  || — || August 25, 2000 || Socorro || LINEAR || — || align=right | 3.1 km || 
|-id=720 bgcolor=#E9E9E9
| 92720 ||  || — || August 25, 2000 || Socorro || LINEAR || BRU || align=right | 7.7 km || 
|-id=721 bgcolor=#fefefe
| 92721 ||  || — || August 26, 2000 || Socorro || LINEAR || — || align=right | 2.2 km || 
|-id=722 bgcolor=#E9E9E9
| 92722 ||  || — || August 26, 2000 || Socorro || LINEAR || — || align=right | 2.1 km || 
|-id=723 bgcolor=#fefefe
| 92723 ||  || — || August 28, 2000 || Socorro || LINEAR || NYS || align=right | 1.8 km || 
|-id=724 bgcolor=#E9E9E9
| 92724 ||  || — || August 28, 2000 || Socorro || LINEAR || EUN || align=right | 3.7 km || 
|-id=725 bgcolor=#fefefe
| 92725 ||  || — || August 28, 2000 || Socorro || LINEAR || — || align=right | 2.0 km || 
|-id=726 bgcolor=#fefefe
| 92726 ||  || — || August 28, 2000 || Socorro || LINEAR || — || align=right | 4.2 km || 
|-id=727 bgcolor=#fefefe
| 92727 ||  || — || August 28, 2000 || Socorro || LINEAR || — || align=right | 2.2 km || 
|-id=728 bgcolor=#fefefe
| 92728 ||  || — || August 28, 2000 || Socorro || LINEAR || — || align=right | 3.3 km || 
|-id=729 bgcolor=#fefefe
| 92729 ||  || — || August 28, 2000 || Socorro || LINEAR || — || align=right | 3.4 km || 
|-id=730 bgcolor=#E9E9E9
| 92730 ||  || — || August 28, 2000 || Socorro || LINEAR || — || align=right | 1.7 km || 
|-id=731 bgcolor=#fefefe
| 92731 ||  || — || August 28, 2000 || Socorro || LINEAR || V || align=right | 2.1 km || 
|-id=732 bgcolor=#fefefe
| 92732 ||  || — || August 28, 2000 || Socorro || LINEAR || FLO || align=right | 2.3 km || 
|-id=733 bgcolor=#fefefe
| 92733 ||  || — || August 28, 2000 || Socorro || LINEAR || — || align=right | 2.3 km || 
|-id=734 bgcolor=#fefefe
| 92734 ||  || — || August 28, 2000 || Socorro || LINEAR || — || align=right | 2.2 km || 
|-id=735 bgcolor=#fefefe
| 92735 ||  || — || August 28, 2000 || Socorro || LINEAR || — || align=right | 2.0 km || 
|-id=736 bgcolor=#E9E9E9
| 92736 ||  || — || August 28, 2000 || Socorro || LINEAR || — || align=right | 3.4 km || 
|-id=737 bgcolor=#E9E9E9
| 92737 ||  || — || August 28, 2000 || Socorro || LINEAR || — || align=right | 2.6 km || 
|-id=738 bgcolor=#fefefe
| 92738 ||  || — || August 28, 2000 || Socorro || LINEAR || — || align=right | 5.0 km || 
|-id=739 bgcolor=#E9E9E9
| 92739 ||  || — || August 28, 2000 || Socorro || LINEAR || — || align=right | 5.2 km || 
|-id=740 bgcolor=#fefefe
| 92740 ||  || — || August 29, 2000 || Socorro || LINEAR || NYS || align=right | 1.5 km || 
|-id=741 bgcolor=#fefefe
| 92741 ||  || — || August 29, 2000 || Socorro || LINEAR || — || align=right | 4.5 km || 
|-id=742 bgcolor=#fefefe
| 92742 ||  || — || August 29, 2000 || Socorro || LINEAR || NYS || align=right | 1.1 km || 
|-id=743 bgcolor=#fefefe
| 92743 ||  || — || August 29, 2000 || Socorro || LINEAR || — || align=right | 2.4 km || 
|-id=744 bgcolor=#E9E9E9
| 92744 ||  || — || August 29, 2000 || Socorro || LINEAR || MAR || align=right | 2.4 km || 
|-id=745 bgcolor=#fefefe
| 92745 ||  || — || August 29, 2000 || Socorro || LINEAR || NYS || align=right | 3.8 km || 
|-id=746 bgcolor=#fefefe
| 92746 ||  || — || August 24, 2000 || Socorro || LINEAR || FLO || align=right | 1.6 km || 
|-id=747 bgcolor=#fefefe
| 92747 ||  || — || August 24, 2000 || Socorro || LINEAR || NYS || align=right | 2.1 km || 
|-id=748 bgcolor=#fefefe
| 92748 ||  || — || August 24, 2000 || Socorro || LINEAR || — || align=right | 1.6 km || 
|-id=749 bgcolor=#E9E9E9
| 92749 ||  || — || August 24, 2000 || Socorro || LINEAR || — || align=right | 2.4 km || 
|-id=750 bgcolor=#fefefe
| 92750 ||  || — || August 24, 2000 || Socorro || LINEAR || NYS || align=right | 4.5 km || 
|-id=751 bgcolor=#fefefe
| 92751 ||  || — || August 24, 2000 || Socorro || LINEAR || — || align=right | 1.8 km || 
|-id=752 bgcolor=#E9E9E9
| 92752 ||  || — || August 24, 2000 || Socorro || LINEAR || — || align=right | 2.8 km || 
|-id=753 bgcolor=#fefefe
| 92753 ||  || — || August 24, 2000 || Socorro || LINEAR || — || align=right | 2.0 km || 
|-id=754 bgcolor=#fefefe
| 92754 ||  || — || August 24, 2000 || Socorro || LINEAR || NYS || align=right | 1.9 km || 
|-id=755 bgcolor=#fefefe
| 92755 ||  || — || August 25, 2000 || Socorro || LINEAR || — || align=right | 1.3 km || 
|-id=756 bgcolor=#fefefe
| 92756 ||  || — || August 26, 2000 || Socorro || LINEAR || — || align=right | 1.8 km || 
|-id=757 bgcolor=#E9E9E9
| 92757 ||  || — || August 25, 2000 || Socorro || LINEAR || — || align=right | 2.4 km || 
|-id=758 bgcolor=#fefefe
| 92758 ||  || — || August 25, 2000 || Socorro || LINEAR || V || align=right | 2.1 km || 
|-id=759 bgcolor=#E9E9E9
| 92759 ||  || — || August 25, 2000 || Socorro || LINEAR || — || align=right | 1.8 km || 
|-id=760 bgcolor=#fefefe
| 92760 ||  || — || August 25, 2000 || Socorro || LINEAR || — || align=right | 2.3 km || 
|-id=761 bgcolor=#fefefe
| 92761 ||  || — || August 25, 2000 || Socorro || LINEAR || — || align=right | 3.4 km || 
|-id=762 bgcolor=#fefefe
| 92762 ||  || — || August 25, 2000 || Socorro || LINEAR || — || align=right | 2.5 km || 
|-id=763 bgcolor=#E9E9E9
| 92763 ||  || — || August 25, 2000 || Socorro || LINEAR || — || align=right | 3.3 km || 
|-id=764 bgcolor=#fefefe
| 92764 ||  || — || August 31, 2000 || Socorro || LINEAR || — || align=right | 1.9 km || 
|-id=765 bgcolor=#E9E9E9
| 92765 ||  || — || August 31, 2000 || Socorro || LINEAR || — || align=right | 1.8 km || 
|-id=766 bgcolor=#E9E9E9
| 92766 ||  || — || August 31, 2000 || Socorro || LINEAR || — || align=right | 2.0 km || 
|-id=767 bgcolor=#fefefe
| 92767 ||  || — || August 31, 2000 || Socorro || LINEAR || — || align=right | 1.9 km || 
|-id=768 bgcolor=#fefefe
| 92768 ||  || — || August 31, 2000 || Socorro || LINEAR || V || align=right | 1.3 km || 
|-id=769 bgcolor=#fefefe
| 92769 ||  || — || August 24, 2000 || Socorro || LINEAR || V || align=right | 1.4 km || 
|-id=770 bgcolor=#fefefe
| 92770 ||  || — || August 30, 2000 || Višnjan Observatory || K. Korlević || MAS || align=right | 1.3 km || 
|-id=771 bgcolor=#fefefe
| 92771 ||  || — || August 26, 2000 || Socorro || LINEAR || — || align=right | 3.2 km || 
|-id=772 bgcolor=#fefefe
| 92772 ||  || — || August 26, 2000 || Socorro || LINEAR || — || align=right | 4.5 km || 
|-id=773 bgcolor=#fefefe
| 92773 ||  || — || August 26, 2000 || Socorro || LINEAR || MAS || align=right | 1.5 km || 
|-id=774 bgcolor=#fefefe
| 92774 ||  || — || August 26, 2000 || Socorro || LINEAR || — || align=right | 3.6 km || 
|-id=775 bgcolor=#fefefe
| 92775 ||  || — || August 26, 2000 || Socorro || LINEAR || — || align=right | 2.2 km || 
|-id=776 bgcolor=#fefefe
| 92776 ||  || — || August 26, 2000 || Socorro || LINEAR || — || align=right | 1.9 km || 
|-id=777 bgcolor=#fefefe
| 92777 ||  || — || August 26, 2000 || Socorro || LINEAR || — || align=right | 1.9 km || 
|-id=778 bgcolor=#E9E9E9
| 92778 ||  || — || August 26, 2000 || Socorro || LINEAR || HNS || align=right | 3.0 km || 
|-id=779 bgcolor=#E9E9E9
| 92779 ||  || — || August 26, 2000 || Socorro || LINEAR || — || align=right | 3.0 km || 
|-id=780 bgcolor=#fefefe
| 92780 ||  || — || August 29, 2000 || Socorro || LINEAR || — || align=right | 1.4 km || 
|-id=781 bgcolor=#fefefe
| 92781 ||  || — || August 29, 2000 || Socorro || LINEAR || V || align=right | 2.1 km || 
|-id=782 bgcolor=#fefefe
| 92782 ||  || — || August 31, 2000 || Socorro || LINEAR || V || align=right | 1.6 km || 
|-id=783 bgcolor=#E9E9E9
| 92783 ||  || — || August 31, 2000 || Socorro || LINEAR || — || align=right | 2.1 km || 
|-id=784 bgcolor=#E9E9E9
| 92784 ||  || — || August 31, 2000 || Socorro || LINEAR || EUN || align=right | 2.8 km || 
|-id=785 bgcolor=#E9E9E9
| 92785 ||  || — || August 31, 2000 || Socorro || LINEAR || — || align=right | 1.7 km || 
|-id=786 bgcolor=#E9E9E9
| 92786 ||  || — || August 31, 2000 || Socorro || LINEAR || — || align=right | 2.3 km || 
|-id=787 bgcolor=#fefefe
| 92787 ||  || — || August 31, 2000 || Socorro || LINEAR || NYS || align=right | 1.5 km || 
|-id=788 bgcolor=#fefefe
| 92788 ||  || — || August 31, 2000 || Socorro || LINEAR || — || align=right | 3.4 km || 
|-id=789 bgcolor=#E9E9E9
| 92789 ||  || — || August 31, 2000 || Socorro || LINEAR || — || align=right | 2.4 km || 
|-id=790 bgcolor=#fefefe
| 92790 ||  || — || August 24, 2000 || Socorro || LINEAR || — || align=right | 1.8 km || 
|-id=791 bgcolor=#E9E9E9
| 92791 ||  || — || August 26, 2000 || Socorro || LINEAR || MAR || align=right | 2.1 km || 
|-id=792 bgcolor=#E9E9E9
| 92792 ||  || — || August 26, 2000 || Socorro || LINEAR || — || align=right | 2.0 km || 
|-id=793 bgcolor=#fefefe
| 92793 ||  || — || August 28, 2000 || Socorro || LINEAR || — || align=right | 1.8 km || 
|-id=794 bgcolor=#fefefe
| 92794 ||  || — || August 29, 2000 || Socorro || LINEAR || — || align=right | 2.0 km || 
|-id=795 bgcolor=#fefefe
| 92795 ||  || — || August 29, 2000 || Socorro || LINEAR || — || align=right | 1.8 km || 
|-id=796 bgcolor=#fefefe
| 92796 ||  || — || August 29, 2000 || Socorro || LINEAR || V || align=right | 1.2 km || 
|-id=797 bgcolor=#E9E9E9
| 92797 ||  || — || August 31, 2000 || Socorro || LINEAR || — || align=right | 4.3 km || 
|-id=798 bgcolor=#fefefe
| 92798 ||  || — || August 31, 2000 || Socorro || LINEAR || — || align=right | 2.4 km || 
|-id=799 bgcolor=#E9E9E9
| 92799 ||  || — || August 31, 2000 || Socorro || LINEAR || — || align=right | 2.1 km || 
|-id=800 bgcolor=#fefefe
| 92800 ||  || — || August 31, 2000 || Socorro || LINEAR || — || align=right | 1.7 km || 
|}

92801–92900 

|-bgcolor=#fefefe
| 92801 ||  || — || August 31, 2000 || Socorro || LINEAR || — || align=right | 1.9 km || 
|-id=802 bgcolor=#fefefe
| 92802 ||  || — || August 31, 2000 || Socorro || LINEAR || — || align=right | 1.8 km || 
|-id=803 bgcolor=#fefefe
| 92803 ||  || — || August 31, 2000 || Socorro || LINEAR || — || align=right | 2.0 km || 
|-id=804 bgcolor=#fefefe
| 92804 ||  || — || August 31, 2000 || Socorro || LINEAR || V || align=right | 4.2 km || 
|-id=805 bgcolor=#fefefe
| 92805 ||  || — || August 31, 2000 || Socorro || LINEAR || — || align=right | 3.1 km || 
|-id=806 bgcolor=#fefefe
| 92806 ||  || — || August 31, 2000 || Socorro || LINEAR || — || align=right | 1.9 km || 
|-id=807 bgcolor=#fefefe
| 92807 ||  || — || August 31, 2000 || Socorro || LINEAR || — || align=right | 1.5 km || 
|-id=808 bgcolor=#fefefe
| 92808 ||  || — || August 31, 2000 || Socorro || LINEAR || — || align=right | 2.5 km || 
|-id=809 bgcolor=#fefefe
| 92809 ||  || — || August 31, 2000 || Socorro || LINEAR || V || align=right | 2.0 km || 
|-id=810 bgcolor=#E9E9E9
| 92810 ||  || — || August 31, 2000 || Socorro || LINEAR || — || align=right | 2.5 km || 
|-id=811 bgcolor=#fefefe
| 92811 ||  || — || August 31, 2000 || Socorro || LINEAR || V || align=right | 1.6 km || 
|-id=812 bgcolor=#fefefe
| 92812 ||  || — || August 31, 2000 || Socorro || LINEAR || — || align=right | 1.5 km || 
|-id=813 bgcolor=#fefefe
| 92813 ||  || — || August 31, 2000 || Socorro || LINEAR || — || align=right | 3.2 km || 
|-id=814 bgcolor=#fefefe
| 92814 ||  || — || August 31, 2000 || Socorro || LINEAR || — || align=right | 3.2 km || 
|-id=815 bgcolor=#fefefe
| 92815 ||  || — || August 31, 2000 || Socorro || LINEAR || — || align=right | 1.8 km || 
|-id=816 bgcolor=#fefefe
| 92816 ||  || — || August 31, 2000 || Socorro || LINEAR || V || align=right | 1.6 km || 
|-id=817 bgcolor=#fefefe
| 92817 ||  || — || August 31, 2000 || Socorro || LINEAR || V || align=right | 1.6 km || 
|-id=818 bgcolor=#fefefe
| 92818 ||  || — || August 31, 2000 || Socorro || LINEAR || — || align=right | 2.2 km || 
|-id=819 bgcolor=#fefefe
| 92819 ||  || — || August 31, 2000 || Socorro || LINEAR || — || align=right | 3.8 km || 
|-id=820 bgcolor=#fefefe
| 92820 ||  || — || August 31, 2000 || Socorro || LINEAR || — || align=right | 1.9 km || 
|-id=821 bgcolor=#E9E9E9
| 92821 ||  || — || August 31, 2000 || Socorro || LINEAR || — || align=right | 1.9 km || 
|-id=822 bgcolor=#E9E9E9
| 92822 ||  || — || August 31, 2000 || Socorro || LINEAR || — || align=right | 1.8 km || 
|-id=823 bgcolor=#E9E9E9
| 92823 ||  || — || August 31, 2000 || Socorro || LINEAR || — || align=right | 1.9 km || 
|-id=824 bgcolor=#fefefe
| 92824 ||  || — || August 31, 2000 || Socorro || LINEAR || — || align=right | 3.8 km || 
|-id=825 bgcolor=#fefefe
| 92825 ||  || — || August 31, 2000 || Socorro || LINEAR || — || align=right | 4.4 km || 
|-id=826 bgcolor=#fefefe
| 92826 ||  || — || August 31, 2000 || Socorro || LINEAR || LCI || align=right | 1.7 km || 
|-id=827 bgcolor=#E9E9E9
| 92827 ||  || — || August 31, 2000 || Socorro || LINEAR || — || align=right | 3.5 km || 
|-id=828 bgcolor=#d6d6d6
| 92828 ||  || — || August 31, 2000 || Socorro || LINEAR || — || align=right | 5.3 km || 
|-id=829 bgcolor=#E9E9E9
| 92829 ||  || — || August 31, 2000 || Socorro || LINEAR || — || align=right | 2.5 km || 
|-id=830 bgcolor=#E9E9E9
| 92830 ||  || — || August 26, 2000 || Socorro || LINEAR || — || align=right | 3.1 km || 
|-id=831 bgcolor=#E9E9E9
| 92831 ||  || — || August 31, 2000 || Socorro || LINEAR || — || align=right | 1.9 km || 
|-id=832 bgcolor=#fefefe
| 92832 ||  || — || August 26, 2000 || Socorro || LINEAR || NYS || align=right | 1.4 km || 
|-id=833 bgcolor=#fefefe
| 92833 ||  || — || August 26, 2000 || Socorro || LINEAR || V || align=right | 1.5 km || 
|-id=834 bgcolor=#fefefe
| 92834 ||  || — || August 26, 2000 || Socorro || LINEAR || — || align=right | 4.0 km || 
|-id=835 bgcolor=#fefefe
| 92835 ||  || — || August 26, 2000 || Socorro || LINEAR || — || align=right | 2.1 km || 
|-id=836 bgcolor=#fefefe
| 92836 ||  || — || August 26, 2000 || Socorro || LINEAR || — || align=right | 2.2 km || 
|-id=837 bgcolor=#fefefe
| 92837 ||  || — || August 26, 2000 || Socorro || LINEAR || — || align=right | 1.9 km || 
|-id=838 bgcolor=#fefefe
| 92838 ||  || — || August 26, 2000 || Socorro || LINEAR || NYS || align=right | 1.4 km || 
|-id=839 bgcolor=#fefefe
| 92839 ||  || — || August 26, 2000 || Socorro || LINEAR || — || align=right | 1.9 km || 
|-id=840 bgcolor=#fefefe
| 92840 ||  || — || August 26, 2000 || Socorro || LINEAR || — || align=right | 1.9 km || 
|-id=841 bgcolor=#fefefe
| 92841 ||  || — || August 26, 2000 || Socorro || LINEAR || V || align=right | 1.6 km || 
|-id=842 bgcolor=#fefefe
| 92842 ||  || — || August 29, 2000 || Socorro || LINEAR || — || align=right | 2.0 km || 
|-id=843 bgcolor=#E9E9E9
| 92843 ||  || — || August 31, 2000 || Socorro || LINEAR || — || align=right | 4.2 km || 
|-id=844 bgcolor=#fefefe
| 92844 ||  || — || August 26, 2000 || Socorro || LINEAR || FLO || align=right | 1.7 km || 
|-id=845 bgcolor=#fefefe
| 92845 ||  || — || August 26, 2000 || Socorro || LINEAR || — || align=right | 2.7 km || 
|-id=846 bgcolor=#fefefe
| 92846 ||  || — || August 28, 2000 || Socorro || LINEAR || — || align=right | 2.8 km || 
|-id=847 bgcolor=#fefefe
| 92847 ||  || — || August 28, 2000 || Socorro || LINEAR || V || align=right | 2.0 km || 
|-id=848 bgcolor=#fefefe
| 92848 ||  || — || August 29, 2000 || Socorro || LINEAR || NYS || align=right | 1.2 km || 
|-id=849 bgcolor=#fefefe
| 92849 ||  || — || August 29, 2000 || Socorro || LINEAR || — || align=right | 1.8 km || 
|-id=850 bgcolor=#fefefe
| 92850 ||  || — || August 29, 2000 || Socorro || LINEAR || NYS || align=right | 1.5 km || 
|-id=851 bgcolor=#fefefe
| 92851 ||  || — || August 29, 2000 || Socorro || LINEAR || — || align=right | 4.5 km || 
|-id=852 bgcolor=#fefefe
| 92852 ||  || — || August 29, 2000 || Socorro || LINEAR || — || align=right | 2.0 km || 
|-id=853 bgcolor=#fefefe
| 92853 ||  || — || August 29, 2000 || Socorro || LINEAR || FLO || align=right | 1.9 km || 
|-id=854 bgcolor=#E9E9E9
| 92854 ||  || — || August 31, 2000 || Socorro || LINEAR || — || align=right | 3.0 km || 
|-id=855 bgcolor=#fefefe
| 92855 ||  || — || August 31, 2000 || Socorro || LINEAR || NYS || align=right | 1.0 km || 
|-id=856 bgcolor=#E9E9E9
| 92856 ||  || — || August 31, 2000 || Socorro || LINEAR || — || align=right | 2.7 km || 
|-id=857 bgcolor=#fefefe
| 92857 ||  || — || August 31, 2000 || Socorro || LINEAR || NYS || align=right | 1.9 km || 
|-id=858 bgcolor=#E9E9E9
| 92858 ||  || — || August 31, 2000 || Socorro || LINEAR || — || align=right | 2.2 km || 
|-id=859 bgcolor=#fefefe
| 92859 ||  || — || August 31, 2000 || Socorro || LINEAR || — || align=right | 1.7 km || 
|-id=860 bgcolor=#fefefe
| 92860 ||  || — || August 31, 2000 || Socorro || LINEAR || — || align=right | 2.3 km || 
|-id=861 bgcolor=#fefefe
| 92861 ||  || — || August 31, 2000 || Socorro || LINEAR || MAS || align=right | 1.8 km || 
|-id=862 bgcolor=#fefefe
| 92862 ||  || — || August 31, 2000 || Socorro || LINEAR || NYS || align=right | 1.9 km || 
|-id=863 bgcolor=#fefefe
| 92863 ||  || — || August 31, 2000 || Socorro || LINEAR || — || align=right | 2.5 km || 
|-id=864 bgcolor=#fefefe
| 92864 ||  || — || August 31, 2000 || Socorro || LINEAR || V || align=right | 1.6 km || 
|-id=865 bgcolor=#E9E9E9
| 92865 ||  || — || August 31, 2000 || Socorro || LINEAR || — || align=right | 2.5 km || 
|-id=866 bgcolor=#E9E9E9
| 92866 ||  || — || August 31, 2000 || Socorro || LINEAR || — || align=right | 2.5 km || 
|-id=867 bgcolor=#E9E9E9
| 92867 ||  || — || August 31, 2000 || Socorro || LINEAR || — || align=right | 1.8 km || 
|-id=868 bgcolor=#E9E9E9
| 92868 ||  || — || August 31, 2000 || Socorro || LINEAR || — || align=right | 4.6 km || 
|-id=869 bgcolor=#fefefe
| 92869 ||  || — || August 31, 2000 || Socorro || LINEAR || V || align=right | 1.4 km || 
|-id=870 bgcolor=#E9E9E9
| 92870 ||  || — || August 31, 2000 || Socorro || LINEAR || — || align=right | 1.7 km || 
|-id=871 bgcolor=#fefefe
| 92871 ||  || — || August 31, 2000 || Socorro || LINEAR || NYS || align=right | 1.2 km || 
|-id=872 bgcolor=#fefefe
| 92872 ||  || — || August 31, 2000 || Socorro || LINEAR || MAS || align=right | 1.5 km || 
|-id=873 bgcolor=#fefefe
| 92873 ||  || — || August 31, 2000 || Socorro || LINEAR || V || align=right | 1.4 km || 
|-id=874 bgcolor=#E9E9E9
| 92874 ||  || — || August 31, 2000 || Socorro || LINEAR || — || align=right | 2.6 km || 
|-id=875 bgcolor=#E9E9E9
| 92875 ||  || — || August 31, 2000 || Socorro || LINEAR || — || align=right | 2.1 km || 
|-id=876 bgcolor=#E9E9E9
| 92876 ||  || — || August 31, 2000 || Socorro || LINEAR || GEF || align=right | 4.8 km || 
|-id=877 bgcolor=#d6d6d6
| 92877 ||  || — || August 31, 2000 || Socorro || LINEAR || — || align=right | 7.7 km || 
|-id=878 bgcolor=#fefefe
| 92878 ||  || — || August 20, 2000 || Anderson Mesa || LONEOS || — || align=right | 1.6 km || 
|-id=879 bgcolor=#fefefe
| 92879 ||  || — || August 20, 2000 || Anderson Mesa || LONEOS || NYS || align=right | 1.4 km || 
|-id=880 bgcolor=#fefefe
| 92880 ||  || — || August 20, 2000 || Anderson Mesa || LONEOS || NYS || align=right | 1.1 km || 
|-id=881 bgcolor=#E9E9E9
| 92881 ||  || — || August 20, 2000 || Anderson Mesa || LONEOS || — || align=right | 1.9 km || 
|-id=882 bgcolor=#E9E9E9
| 92882 ||  || — || August 26, 2000 || Kitt Peak || Spacewatch || — || align=right | 3.3 km || 
|-id=883 bgcolor=#fefefe
| 92883 ||  || — || August 29, 2000 || Socorro || LINEAR || NYS || align=right | 1.4 km || 
|-id=884 bgcolor=#E9E9E9
| 92884 ||  || — || August 30, 2000 || Kitt Peak || Spacewatch || — || align=right | 2.2 km || 
|-id=885 bgcolor=#fefefe
| 92885 ||  || — || August 31, 2000 || Socorro || LINEAR || — || align=right | 1.6 km || 
|-id=886 bgcolor=#fefefe
| 92886 ||  || — || August 31, 2000 || Socorro || LINEAR || NYS || align=right | 1.3 km || 
|-id=887 bgcolor=#E9E9E9
| 92887 ||  || — || August 31, 2000 || Socorro || LINEAR || — || align=right | 1.9 km || 
|-id=888 bgcolor=#E9E9E9
| 92888 ||  || — || August 31, 2000 || Socorro || LINEAR || ADE || align=right | 3.8 km || 
|-id=889 bgcolor=#E9E9E9
| 92889 ||  || — || August 31, 2000 || Kitt Peak || Spacewatch || — || align=right | 1.7 km || 
|-id=890 bgcolor=#E9E9E9
| 92890 ||  || — || August 30, 2000 || Kitt Peak || Spacewatch || HNS || align=right | 1.8 km || 
|-id=891 bgcolor=#fefefe
| 92891 Bless ||  ||  || August 26, 2000 || Cerro Tololo || R. Millis || V || align=right | 1.6 km || 
|-id=892 bgcolor=#fefefe
| 92892 Robertlawrence ||  ||  || August 25, 2000 || Cerro Tololo || M. W. Buie || FLO || align=right | 2.0 km || 
|-id=893 bgcolor=#fefefe
| 92893 Michaelperson ||  ||  || August 27, 2000 || Cerro Tololo || S. D. Kern || NYS || align=right | 1.4 km || 
|-id=894 bgcolor=#fefefe
| 92894 Bluford ||  ||  || August 28, 2000 || Cerro Tololo || M. W. Buie || ERI || align=right | 3.0 km || 
|-id=895 bgcolor=#fefefe
| 92895 ||  || — || August 21, 2000 || Anderson Mesa || LONEOS || — || align=right | 1.5 km || 
|-id=896 bgcolor=#fefefe
| 92896 ||  || — || August 21, 2000 || Anderson Mesa || LONEOS || V || align=right | 1.9 km || 
|-id=897 bgcolor=#E9E9E9
| 92897 || 2000 RV || — || September 1, 2000 || Socorro || LINEAR || — || align=right | 2.9 km || 
|-id=898 bgcolor=#E9E9E9
| 92898 ||  || — || September 1, 2000 || Socorro || LINEAR || — || align=right | 2.7 km || 
|-id=899 bgcolor=#E9E9E9
| 92899 ||  || — || September 1, 2000 || Socorro || LINEAR || — || align=right | 8.5 km || 
|-id=900 bgcolor=#E9E9E9
| 92900 ||  || — || September 1, 2000 || Socorro || LINEAR || — || align=right | 3.3 km || 
|}

92901–93000 

|-bgcolor=#E9E9E9
| 92901 ||  || — || September 1, 2000 || Socorro || LINEAR || HNS || align=right | 2.8 km || 
|-id=902 bgcolor=#E9E9E9
| 92902 ||  || — || September 1, 2000 || Socorro || LINEAR || — || align=right | 2.4 km || 
|-id=903 bgcolor=#fefefe
| 92903 ||  || — || September 1, 2000 || Socorro || LINEAR || — || align=right | 3.5 km || 
|-id=904 bgcolor=#E9E9E9
| 92904 ||  || — || September 1, 2000 || Socorro || LINEAR || — || align=right | 2.8 km || 
|-id=905 bgcolor=#E9E9E9
| 92905 ||  || — || September 1, 2000 || Socorro || LINEAR || — || align=right | 2.4 km || 
|-id=906 bgcolor=#E9E9E9
| 92906 ||  || — || September 1, 2000 || Socorro || LINEAR || MAR || align=right | 2.8 km || 
|-id=907 bgcolor=#E9E9E9
| 92907 ||  || — || September 1, 2000 || Socorro || LINEAR || HNS || align=right | 3.8 km || 
|-id=908 bgcolor=#E9E9E9
| 92908 ||  || — || September 1, 2000 || Socorro || LINEAR || — || align=right | 4.0 km || 
|-id=909 bgcolor=#E9E9E9
| 92909 ||  || — || September 1, 2000 || Socorro || LINEAR || — || align=right | 6.0 km || 
|-id=910 bgcolor=#E9E9E9
| 92910 ||  || — || September 1, 2000 || Socorro || LINEAR || — || align=right | 2.9 km || 
|-id=911 bgcolor=#E9E9E9
| 92911 ||  || — || September 1, 2000 || Socorro || LINEAR || — || align=right | 5.7 km || 
|-id=912 bgcolor=#E9E9E9
| 92912 ||  || — || September 1, 2000 || Socorro || LINEAR || — || align=right | 2.5 km || 
|-id=913 bgcolor=#E9E9E9
| 92913 ||  || — || September 1, 2000 || Socorro || LINEAR || — || align=right | 2.2 km || 
|-id=914 bgcolor=#fefefe
| 92914 ||  || — || September 1, 2000 || Socorro || LINEAR || — || align=right | 1.4 km || 
|-id=915 bgcolor=#E9E9E9
| 92915 ||  || — || September 1, 2000 || Socorro || LINEAR || ADE || align=right | 6.3 km || 
|-id=916 bgcolor=#fefefe
| 92916 ||  || — || September 1, 2000 || Socorro || LINEAR || — || align=right | 2.7 km || 
|-id=917 bgcolor=#fefefe
| 92917 ||  || — || September 1, 2000 || Socorro || LINEAR || — || align=right | 1.7 km || 
|-id=918 bgcolor=#fefefe
| 92918 ||  || — || September 1, 2000 || Socorro || LINEAR || V || align=right | 1.3 km || 
|-id=919 bgcolor=#fefefe
| 92919 ||  || — || September 1, 2000 || Socorro || LINEAR || — || align=right | 2.7 km || 
|-id=920 bgcolor=#fefefe
| 92920 ||  || — || September 1, 2000 || Socorro || LINEAR || — || align=right | 2.1 km || 
|-id=921 bgcolor=#fefefe
| 92921 ||  || — || September 1, 2000 || Socorro || LINEAR || — || align=right | 2.8 km || 
|-id=922 bgcolor=#fefefe
| 92922 ||  || — || September 1, 2000 || Socorro || LINEAR || — || align=right | 1.9 km || 
|-id=923 bgcolor=#E9E9E9
| 92923 ||  || — || September 1, 2000 || Socorro || LINEAR || — || align=right | 1.9 km || 
|-id=924 bgcolor=#fefefe
| 92924 ||  || — || September 1, 2000 || Socorro || LINEAR || V || align=right | 1.8 km || 
|-id=925 bgcolor=#E9E9E9
| 92925 ||  || — || September 1, 2000 || Socorro || LINEAR || — || align=right | 4.0 km || 
|-id=926 bgcolor=#E9E9E9
| 92926 ||  || — || September 1, 2000 || Socorro || LINEAR || — || align=right | 2.1 km || 
|-id=927 bgcolor=#E9E9E9
| 92927 ||  || — || September 1, 2000 || Socorro || LINEAR || — || align=right | 3.1 km || 
|-id=928 bgcolor=#E9E9E9
| 92928 ||  || — || September 1, 2000 || Socorro || LINEAR || — || align=right | 3.4 km || 
|-id=929 bgcolor=#fefefe
| 92929 ||  || — || September 1, 2000 || Socorro || LINEAR || V || align=right | 1.8 km || 
|-id=930 bgcolor=#E9E9E9
| 92930 ||  || — || September 1, 2000 || Socorro || LINEAR || — || align=right | 4.5 km || 
|-id=931 bgcolor=#E9E9E9
| 92931 ||  || — || September 1, 2000 || Socorro || LINEAR || EUN || align=right | 2.3 km || 
|-id=932 bgcolor=#fefefe
| 92932 ||  || — || September 1, 2000 || Socorro || LINEAR || — || align=right | 5.4 km || 
|-id=933 bgcolor=#E9E9E9
| 92933 ||  || — || September 1, 2000 || Socorro || LINEAR || JUN || align=right | 2.4 km || 
|-id=934 bgcolor=#E9E9E9
| 92934 ||  || — || September 1, 2000 || Socorro || LINEAR || — || align=right | 4.7 km || 
|-id=935 bgcolor=#E9E9E9
| 92935 ||  || — || September 1, 2000 || Socorro || LINEAR || — || align=right | 2.6 km || 
|-id=936 bgcolor=#E9E9E9
| 92936 ||  || — || September 1, 2000 || Socorro || LINEAR || — || align=right | 3.0 km || 
|-id=937 bgcolor=#fefefe
| 92937 ||  || — || September 1, 2000 || Socorro || LINEAR || — || align=right | 2.3 km || 
|-id=938 bgcolor=#E9E9E9
| 92938 ||  || — || September 1, 2000 || Socorro || LINEAR || HNS || align=right | 2.9 km || 
|-id=939 bgcolor=#E9E9E9
| 92939 ||  || — || September 1, 2000 || Socorro || LINEAR || — || align=right | 3.5 km || 
|-id=940 bgcolor=#E9E9E9
| 92940 ||  || — || September 1, 2000 || Socorro || LINEAR || EUN || align=right | 3.1 km || 
|-id=941 bgcolor=#E9E9E9
| 92941 ||  || — || September 1, 2000 || Socorro || LINEAR || — || align=right | 5.3 km || 
|-id=942 bgcolor=#E9E9E9
| 92942 ||  || — || September 1, 2000 || Socorro || LINEAR || — || align=right | 4.6 km || 
|-id=943 bgcolor=#E9E9E9
| 92943 ||  || — || September 5, 2000 || Kvistaberg || UDAS || — || align=right | 4.4 km || 
|-id=944 bgcolor=#E9E9E9
| 92944 ||  || — || September 5, 2000 || Kvistaberg || UDAS || — || align=right | 1.8 km || 
|-id=945 bgcolor=#E9E9E9
| 92945 ||  || — || September 1, 2000 || Socorro || LINEAR || MAR || align=right | 3.3 km || 
|-id=946 bgcolor=#E9E9E9
| 92946 ||  || — || September 3, 2000 || Socorro || LINEAR || — || align=right | 2.5 km || 
|-id=947 bgcolor=#E9E9E9
| 92947 ||  || — || September 3, 2000 || Socorro || LINEAR || — || align=right | 6.0 km || 
|-id=948 bgcolor=#E9E9E9
| 92948 ||  || — || September 3, 2000 || Socorro || LINEAR || — || align=right | 6.5 km || 
|-id=949 bgcolor=#fefefe
| 92949 ||  || — || September 3, 2000 || Socorro || LINEAR || — || align=right | 4.5 km || 
|-id=950 bgcolor=#fefefe
| 92950 ||  || — || September 3, 2000 || Socorro || LINEAR || — || align=right | 2.3 km || 
|-id=951 bgcolor=#E9E9E9
| 92951 ||  || — || September 3, 2000 || Socorro || LINEAR || — || align=right | 7.0 km || 
|-id=952 bgcolor=#fefefe
| 92952 ||  || — || September 3, 2000 || Socorro || LINEAR || — || align=right | 2.8 km || 
|-id=953 bgcolor=#E9E9E9
| 92953 ||  || — || September 3, 2000 || Socorro || LINEAR || IAN || align=right | 1.2 km || 
|-id=954 bgcolor=#E9E9E9
| 92954 ||  || — || September 3, 2000 || Socorro || LINEAR || MAR || align=right | 2.4 km || 
|-id=955 bgcolor=#E9E9E9
| 92955 ||  || — || September 3, 2000 || Socorro || LINEAR || — || align=right | 3.9 km || 
|-id=956 bgcolor=#E9E9E9
| 92956 ||  || — || September 3, 2000 || Socorro || LINEAR || — || align=right | 5.9 km || 
|-id=957 bgcolor=#fefefe
| 92957 ||  || — || September 3, 2000 || Socorro || LINEAR || — || align=right | 3.4 km || 
|-id=958 bgcolor=#E9E9E9
| 92958 ||  || — || September 3, 2000 || Socorro || LINEAR || — || align=right | 3.3 km || 
|-id=959 bgcolor=#fefefe
| 92959 ||  || — || September 3, 2000 || Socorro || LINEAR || — || align=right | 5.2 km || 
|-id=960 bgcolor=#E9E9E9
| 92960 ||  || — || September 3, 2000 || Socorro || LINEAR || JUN || align=right | 2.1 km || 
|-id=961 bgcolor=#E9E9E9
| 92961 ||  || — || September 3, 2000 || Socorro || LINEAR || EUN || align=right | 3.5 km || 
|-id=962 bgcolor=#E9E9E9
| 92962 ||  || — || September 3, 2000 || Socorro || LINEAR || — || align=right | 2.9 km || 
|-id=963 bgcolor=#E9E9E9
| 92963 ||  || — || September 3, 2000 || Socorro || LINEAR || KRM || align=right | 6.7 km || 
|-id=964 bgcolor=#E9E9E9
| 92964 ||  || — || September 3, 2000 || Socorro || LINEAR || — || align=right | 3.4 km || 
|-id=965 bgcolor=#E9E9E9
| 92965 ||  || — || September 5, 2000 || Socorro || LINEAR || EUN || align=right | 4.8 km || 
|-id=966 bgcolor=#E9E9E9
| 92966 ||  || — || September 5, 2000 || Socorro || LINEAR || — || align=right | 3.2 km || 
|-id=967 bgcolor=#E9E9E9
| 92967 ||  || — || September 5, 2000 || Socorro || LINEAR || — || align=right | 3.9 km || 
|-id=968 bgcolor=#d6d6d6
| 92968 ||  || — || September 5, 2000 || Socorro || LINEAR || — || align=right | 4.8 km || 
|-id=969 bgcolor=#E9E9E9
| 92969 ||  || — || September 3, 2000 || Socorro || LINEAR || — || align=right | 3.1 km || 
|-id=970 bgcolor=#fefefe
| 92970 ||  || — || September 5, 2000 || Socorro || LINEAR || NYS || align=right | 1.4 km || 
|-id=971 bgcolor=#E9E9E9
| 92971 ||  || — || September 6, 2000 || Socorro || LINEAR || XIZ || align=right | 3.9 km || 
|-id=972 bgcolor=#E9E9E9
| 92972 ||  || — || September 5, 2000 || Višnjan Observatory || K. Korlević || — || align=right | 3.3 km || 
|-id=973 bgcolor=#E9E9E9
| 92973 ||  || — || September 3, 2000 || Socorro || LINEAR || — || align=right | 5.3 km || 
|-id=974 bgcolor=#E9E9E9
| 92974 ||  || — || September 1, 2000 || Socorro || LINEAR || EUN || align=right | 2.7 km || 
|-id=975 bgcolor=#fefefe
| 92975 ||  || — || September 1, 2000 || Socorro || LINEAR || — || align=right | 3.9 km || 
|-id=976 bgcolor=#E9E9E9
| 92976 ||  || — || September 1, 2000 || Socorro || LINEAR || EUN || align=right | 2.6 km || 
|-id=977 bgcolor=#E9E9E9
| 92977 ||  || — || September 1, 2000 || Socorro || LINEAR || EUN || align=right | 3.3 km || 
|-id=978 bgcolor=#E9E9E9
| 92978 ||  || — || September 2, 2000 || Socorro || LINEAR || — || align=right | 3.3 km || 
|-id=979 bgcolor=#E9E9E9
| 92979 ||  || — || September 2, 2000 || Socorro || LINEAR || — || align=right | 7.5 km || 
|-id=980 bgcolor=#E9E9E9
| 92980 ||  || — || September 2, 2000 || Socorro || LINEAR || — || align=right | 2.8 km || 
|-id=981 bgcolor=#E9E9E9
| 92981 ||  || — || September 2, 2000 || Socorro || LINEAR || — || align=right | 4.3 km || 
|-id=982 bgcolor=#E9E9E9
| 92982 ||  || — || September 2, 2000 || Socorro || LINEAR || HEN || align=right | 2.9 km || 
|-id=983 bgcolor=#E9E9E9
| 92983 ||  || — || September 2, 2000 || Socorro || LINEAR || HNS || align=right | 2.2 km || 
|-id=984 bgcolor=#E9E9E9
| 92984 ||  || — || September 2, 2000 || Socorro || LINEAR || — || align=right | 2.2 km || 
|-id=985 bgcolor=#fefefe
| 92985 ||  || — || September 2, 2000 || Socorro || LINEAR || — || align=right | 1.5 km || 
|-id=986 bgcolor=#fefefe
| 92986 ||  || — || September 2, 2000 || Socorro || LINEAR || NYS || align=right | 3.0 km || 
|-id=987 bgcolor=#fefefe
| 92987 ||  || — || September 2, 2000 || Socorro || LINEAR || ERI || align=right | 4.4 km || 
|-id=988 bgcolor=#E9E9E9
| 92988 ||  || — || September 2, 2000 || Socorro || LINEAR || — || align=right | 1.8 km || 
|-id=989 bgcolor=#E9E9E9
| 92989 ||  || — || September 2, 2000 || Socorro || LINEAR || GER || align=right | 3.8 km || 
|-id=990 bgcolor=#E9E9E9
| 92990 ||  || — || September 2, 2000 || Socorro || LINEAR || — || align=right | 4.1 km || 
|-id=991 bgcolor=#fefefe
| 92991 ||  || — || September 3, 2000 || Socorro || LINEAR || — || align=right | 3.8 km || 
|-id=992 bgcolor=#fefefe
| 92992 ||  || — || September 3, 2000 || Socorro || LINEAR || V || align=right | 1.4 km || 
|-id=993 bgcolor=#E9E9E9
| 92993 ||  || — || September 3, 2000 || Socorro || LINEAR || — || align=right | 5.1 km || 
|-id=994 bgcolor=#E9E9E9
| 92994 ||  || — || September 3, 2000 || Socorro || LINEAR || ADE || align=right | 4.7 km || 
|-id=995 bgcolor=#E9E9E9
| 92995 ||  || — || September 2, 2000 || Anderson Mesa || LONEOS || — || align=right | 2.4 km || 
|-id=996 bgcolor=#fefefe
| 92996 ||  || — || September 9, 2000 || Črni Vrh || Črni Vrh || — || align=right | 2.5 km || 
|-id=997 bgcolor=#fefefe
| 92997 ||  || — || September 9, 2000 || Desert Beaver || W. K. Y. Yeung || — || align=right | 2.9 km || 
|-id=998 bgcolor=#E9E9E9
| 92998 ||  || — || September 1, 2000 || Socorro || LINEAR || — || align=right | 2.4 km || 
|-id=999 bgcolor=#E9E9E9
| 92999 ||  || — || September 1, 2000 || Socorro || LINEAR || — || align=right | 3.2 km || 
|-id=000 bgcolor=#E9E9E9
| 93000 ||  || — || September 1, 2000 || Socorro || LINEAR || — || align=right | 2.4 km || 
|}

References

External links 
 Discovery Circumstances: Numbered Minor Planets (90001)–(95000) (IAU Minor Planet Center)

0092